Native Americans, also known as American Indians, First Americans, Indigenous Americans, and other terms, are the Indigenous peoples of the mainland United States (Indigenous peoples of Hawaii, Alaska and territories of the United States are generally known by other terms). There are 574 federally recognized tribes living within the US, about half of which are associated with Indian reservations. As defined by the United States Census, "Native Americans" are Indigenous tribes that are originally from the contiguous United States, along with Alaska Natives. Indigenous peoples of the United States who are not listed as American Indian or Alaska Native include Native Hawaiians, Samoan Americans, and Chamorros. The US Census groups these peoples as "Native Hawaiian and other Pacific Islanders".

European colonization of the Americas, which began in 1492, resulted in a precipitous decline in Native American population because of new diseases (including weaponized diseases and biological warfare by European colonizers), wars, ethnic cleansing, and enslavement. After its formation, the United States, as part of its policy of settler colonialism, continued to wage war and perpetrated massacres against many Native American peoples, removed them from their ancestral lands, and subjected them to one-sided treaties and to discriminatory government policies, later focused on forced assimilation, into the 20th century. Since the 1960s, Native American self-determination movements have resulted in positive changes to the lives of many Native Americans, though there are still many contemporary issues faced by them. Today, there are over five million Native Americans in the United States, 78% of whom live outside reservations. The states with the highest percentage of Native Americans in the U.S. are Alaska, New Mexico, South Dakota, Montana, and North Dakota.

When the United States was created, established Native American tribes were generally considered semi-independent nations, as they generally lived in communities separate from white settlers. The federal government signed treaties at a government-to-government level until the Indian Appropriations Act of 1871 ended recognition of independent Native nations, and started treating them as "domestic dependent nations" subject to applicable federal laws. This law did preserve the rights and privileges agreed to under the treaties, including a large degree of tribal sovereignty. For this reason, many Native American reservations are still independent of state law and the actions of tribal citizens on these reservations are subject only to tribal courts and federal law, often differently applicable to tribal lands than to U.S. state or territory by exemption, exclusion, treaty, or superseding tribal or federal law.

The Indian Citizenship Act of 1924 granted U.S. citizenship to all Native Americans born in the United States who had not yet obtained it. This emptied the "Indians not taxed" category established by the United States Constitution, allowed Natives to vote in state and federal elections, and extended the Fourteenth Amendment protections granted to people "subject to the jurisdiction" of the United States. However, some states continued to deny Native Americans voting rights for several decades. Titles II through VII of the Civil Rights Act of 1968 comprise the Indian Civil Rights Act, which applies to the Native American tribes of the United States and makes many but not all of the guarantees of the U.S. Bill of Rights applicable within the tribes (that Act appears today in Title 25, sections 1301 to 1303 of the United States Code).

Background
Beginning towards the end of the 15th century, the migration of Europeans to the Americas led to centuries of population, cultural, and agricultural transfer and adjustment between Old and New World societies, a process known as the Columbian exchange. As most Native American groups had previously preserved their histories by means of oral traditions and artwork, the first written accounts of the contact were provided by Europeans.

Ethnographers commonly classify the Indigenous peoples of North America into ten geographical regions with shared cultural traits, called cultural areas. Some scholars combine the Plateau and Great Basin regions into the Intermontane West, some separate Prairie peoples from Great Plains peoples, while some separate Great Lakes tribes from the Northeastern Woodlands. The ten cultural areas are:
 Arctic, including Aleut, Inuit, and Yupik peoples
 Subarctic
 Northeastern Woodlands
 Southeastern Woodlands
 Great Plains
 Great Basin
 Northwest Plateau
 Northwest Coast
 California
 Southwest (Oasisamerica)

At the time of the first contact, the Indigenous cultures were quite different from those of the proto-industrial and mostly Christian immigrants. Some Northeastern and Southwestern cultures, in particular, were matrilineal and operated on a more collective basis than that with which Europeans were familiar. The majority of Indigenous American tribes treated their hunting grounds and agricultural lands as being for the use of their entire tribe. At that time, Europeans had cultures that had developed concepts of individual property rights with respect to land that were extremely different. The differences in cultures between the established Native Americans and immigrant Europeans, as well as the shifting alliances among different nations during periods of warfare caused extensive political tension, ethnic violence, and social disruption.

Native Americans suffered high fatality rates from contact with European diseases that were new to them, and to which they had not yet acquired immunity; the diseases were endemic to the Spanish and other Europeans, and were spread by direct contact-probably primarily contact with domesticated pigs that had been brought over by European expeditions and had then escaped. Smallpox epidemics are thought to have caused the greatest loss of life for Indigenous populations. As William M. Denevan, a noted author and Professor Emeritus of Geography at the University of Wisconsin-Madison, in "The Pristine Myth: The Landscape of the Americas in 1492": "The decline of native American populations was rapid and severe, probably the greatest demographic disaster ever. Old World diseases were the primary killer. In many regions, particularly the tropical lowlands, populations fell by 90 percent or more in the first century after the contact."

Estimates of the size of the pre-Columbian population of the area that today is the United States vary considerably. They range from William M. Denevan's estimate of 3.8 million- in his 1992 work, The Native Population of the Americas in 1492-to Henry F. Dobyns's 18 million in his 1983 work,Their Number Become Thinned. Because Henry F. Dobyns’ is by far the highest single-point estimate among professional academic researchers, it has been criticized as "politically motivated". Dobyns' most vehement critic is perhaps David Henige, a bibliographer of African literature at the University of Wisconsin, whose Numbers From Nowhere (1998) has been jocularly described as "a landmark in the literature of demographic fulmination". Henige writes of Dobyns' work, "Suspect in 1966, it is no less suspect nowadays … If anything, it is worse."

After the thirteen British colonies revolted against Great Britain and established the United States, President George Washington and Secretary of War Henry Knox conceived the idea of "civilizing" Native Americans in preparation for their assimilation as U.S. citizens. Assimilation (whether it was voluntary, as it was with the Choctaw, or forced), was consistently maintained as a matter of policy by a number of consecutive American administrations. During the 19th century, the ideology known as manifest destiny became integral to the American nationalist movement. Westward expansion of European-American populations after the American Revolution resulted in increasing pressure on Native Americans and their lands, warfare, and rising tensions. In 1830, the U.S. Congress passed the Indian Removal Act, authorizing the government to relocate Native Americans from their homelands within established states to lands west of the Mississippi River, in order to accommodate continued European-American expansion. This resulted in what amounted to the ethnic cleansing of many tribes and brutal forced marches that came to be known as the Trail of Tears.

Contemporary Native Americans have a unique relationship with the United States because they may be members of nations, tribes, or bands that have sovereignty and treaty rights upon which federal Indian law and a federal Indian trust relationship are based. Cultural activism since the late 1960s has increased the participation of Indigenous peoples in American politics. It has also led to expanded efforts to teach and preserve Indigenous languages for younger generations, and to establish a more robust cultural infrastructure: Native Americans have founded independent newspapers and online media outlets, including First Nations Experience, the first Native American television channel; established Native American studies programs, tribal schools universities, museums and language programs. Literature is at the growing forefront of American Indian studies in many genres, with the notable exception of fiction—some traditional American Indians experience fictional narratives as insulting when they conflict with traditional oral tribal narratives.

The terms used to refer to Native Americans have at times been controversial. The ways Native Americans refer to themselves vary by region and generation, with many older Native Americans self-identifying as "Indians" or "American Indians", while younger Native Americans often identify as "Indigenous" or "Aboriginal". The term "Native American" has not traditionally included Native Hawaiians or certain Alaskan Natives, such as Aleut, Yup'ik, or Inuit peoples. By comparison, the Indigenous peoples of Canada are generally known as First Nations.

History

Settlement of the Americas

It is not definitively known how or when the Native Americans first emerged from, or settled, the Americas and the present-day United States. The most popular theory proposes that people migrated from Eurasia across Beringia, a land bridge that connected Siberia to present-day Alaska, and then spread southward throughout the Americas over subsequent generations. The 2021 findings of fossilized human footprints in relict lake sediments near White Sands National Park in New Mexico suggests human presence dating back to the Last Glacial Maximum (LGM), between 18,000 and 26,000 years ago. This age is based on a well-constrained stratigraphic record and radiocarbon dating of seeds in the sediments. Pre-LGM migration across Beringia has also been proposed to explain purported pre-LGM ages of archaeological sites in the Americas such as Bluefish Caves in the Yukon Territory, and Meadowcroft Rock Shelter in Pennsylvania.

Genetic evidence has suggested at least three waves of migrants arrived from East Asia, with the first occurring at least 15,000 years ago. These migrations may have begun as early as 30,000 years ago and continued to about 10,000 years ago, when the land bridge became submerged by the rising sea level at the onset of the current interglacial period.

In November 2018, scientists of the University of São Paulo and Harvard University released a study of Luzia Woman, a 11,500-year-old skeleton of a Paleo-Indian woman who was found in a cave in Brazil. While initially believed to be part of the wave of Asian migrants, DNA and other evidence has shown this to be improbable. Using DNA sequencing, the results showed that Luzia was "entirely Amerindian", genetically.

Pre-Columbian era

The pre-Columbian era incorporates all period subdivisions in the history and prehistory of the Americas before the appearance of significant European influences on the American continents, spanning the time of the original settlement in the Upper Paleolithic period to European colonization during the early modern period. While technically referring to the era before Christopher Columbus' 1492 arrival on the continent, in practice the term usually includes the history of Indigenous cultures until they were conquered or significantly influenced by Europeans, even if this happened decades, or even centuries, after Columbus' initial landing.

Native American cultures are not normally included in characterizations of advanced Stone Age cultures as "Neolithic", which is a category that more often includes only the cultures in Eurasia, Africa, and other regions. The archaeological periods used are the classifications of archaeological periods and cultures established in Gordon Willey and Philip Phillips' 1958 book Method and Theory in American Archaeology. They divided the archaeological record in the Americas into five phases.

Lithic stage

Numerous Paleoindian cultures occupied North America, with some arrayed around the Great Plains and Great Lakes of the modern United States and Canada, as well as  areas to the West and Southwest. According to the oral histories of many of the Indigenous peoples, they have been living on this continent since their genesis, described by a wide range of traditional creation stories. Other tribes have stories that recount migrations across long tracts of land and a great river believed to be the Mississippi River. Genetic and linguistic data connect the Indigenous people of this continent with ancient northeast Asians. Archeological and linguistic data has enabled scholars to discover some of the migrations within the Americas.

Archeological evidence at the Gault site near Austin, Texas, demonstrates that pre-Clovis peoples settled in Texas some 16,000–20,000 years ago. Evidence of pre-Clovis cultures have also been found in the Paisley Caves in south-central Oregon and butchered mastodon bones in a sinkhole near Tallahassee, Florida. More convincingly but also controversially, another pre-Clovis has been discovered at Monte Verde, Chile.

The Clovis culture, a megafauna hunting culture, is primarily identified by the use of fluted spear points. Artifacts from this culture were first excavated in 1932 near Clovis, New Mexico. The Clovis culture ranged over much of North America and appeared in South America. The culture is identified by the distinctive Clovis point, a flaked flint spear-point with a notched flute, by which it was inserted into a shaft. The dating of Clovis materials has been by association with animal bones and by the use of carbon dating methods. Recent reexaminations of Clovis materials using improved carbon-dating methods produced results of 11,050 and 10,800 radiocarbon years B.P. (roughly 9100 to 8850 BCE).

The Folsom tradition was characterized by the use of Folsom points as projectile tips and activities known from kill sites, where slaughter and butchering of bison took place. Folsom tools were left behind between 9000 BCE and 8000 BCE.

Na-Dené-speaking peoples entered North America starting around 8000 BCE, reaching the Pacific Northwest by 5000 BCE, and from there migrating along the Pacific Coast and into the interior. Linguists, anthropologists, and archaeologists believe their ancestors comprised a separate migration into North America, later than the first Paleo-Indians. They migrated into Alaska and northern Canada, south along the Pacific Coast, into the interior of Canada, and south to the Great Plains and the American Southwest. Na-Dené-speaking peoples were the earliest ancestors of the Athabascan-speaking peoples, including the present-day and historical Navajo and Apache. They constructed large multi-family dwellings in their villages, which were used seasonally. People did not live there year-round, but for the summer to hunt and fish, and to gather food supplies for the winter.

Archaic period

Since the 1990s, archaeologists have explored and dated eleven Middle Archaic sites in present-day Louisiana and Florida at which early cultures built complexes with multiple earthwork mounds; they were societies of hunter-gatherers rather than the settled agriculturalists believed necessary according to the theory of Neolithic Revolution to sustain such large villages over long periods. The prime example is Watson Brake in northern Louisiana, whose 11-mound complex is dated to 3500 BCE, making it the oldest, dated site in North America for such complex construction. It is nearly 2,000 years older than the Poverty Point site. Construction of the mounds went on for 500 years until the site was abandoned about 2800 BCE, probably due to changing environmental conditions.

The Oshara tradition people lived from around 5,440 BCE to 460 CE. They were part of the Southwestern Archaic tradition centered in north-central New Mexico, the San Juan Basin, the Rio Grande Valley, southern Colorado, and southeastern Utah.

Poverty Point culture is a Late Archaic archaeological culture that inhabited the area of the lower Mississippi Valley and surrounding Gulf Coast. The culture thrived from 2200 BCE to 700 BCE, during the Late Archaic period. Evidence of this culture has been found at more than 100 sites, from the major complex at Poverty Point, Louisiana (a UNESCO World Heritage Site) across a  range to the Jaketown Site near Belzoni, Mississippi.

Post-archaic period

The Formative, Classic and post-Classic stages are sometimes incorporated together as the Post-archaic period, which runs from 1000 BCE onward. Sites & cultures include: Adena, Old Copper, Oasisamerica, Woodland, Fort Ancient, Hopewell tradition and Mississippian cultures.

The Woodland period of North American pre-Columbian cultures refers to the time period from roughly 1000 BCE to 1000 CE in the eastern part of North America. The Eastern Woodlands cultural region covers what is now eastern Canada south of the Subarctic region, the Eastern United States, along to the Gulf of Mexico. The Hopewell tradition describes the common aspects of the culture that flourished along rivers in the northeastern and midwestern United States from 100 BCE to 500 CE, in the Middle Woodland period. The Hopewell tradition was not a single culture or society, but a widely dispersed set of related populations. They were connected by a common network of trade routes. This period is considered a developmental stage without any massive changes in a short period, but instead having a continuous development in stone and bone tools, leather working, textile manufacture, tool production, cultivation, and shelter construction.

The Indigenous peoples of the Pacific Northwest Coast were of many nations and tribal affiliations, each with distinctive cultural and political identities, but they shared certain beliefs, traditions, and practices, such as the centrality of salmon as a resource and spiritual symbol. Their gift-giving feast, potlatch, is a highly complex event where people gather in order to commemorate special events. These events include the raising of a Totem pole or the appointment or election of a new chief. The most famous artistic feature of the culture is the Totem pole, with carvings of animals and other characters to commemorate cultural beliefs, legends, and notable events.

The Mississippian culture was a mound-building Native American civilization archaeologists date from approximately 800 CE to 1600 CE, varying regionally. It was composed of a series of urban settlements and satellite villages (suburbs) linked together by a loose trading network, the largest city being Cahokia, believed to be a major religious center. The civilization flourished in what is now the Midwestern, Eastern, and Southeastern United States.

Numerous pre-Columbian societies were sedentary, such as the Pueblo peoples, Mandan, Hidatsa and others, and some established large settlements, even cities, such as Cahokia, in what is now Illinois. The Iroquois League of Nations or "People of the Long House" was a politically advanced, democratic society, which is thought by some historians to have influenced the United States Constitution, with the Senate passing a resolution to this effect in 1988. Other historians have contested this interpretation and believe the impact was minimal, or did not exist, pointing to numerous differences between the two systems and the ample precedents for the constitution in European political thought.

European exploration and colonization

After 1492, European exploration and colonization of the Americas revolutionized how the Old and New Worlds perceived themselves. Many of the first major contacts were in Florida and the Gulf coast by Spanish explorers.

The Use of the Doctrine of Discovery 
During European exploration and colonization of the Americas, the Europeans adopted the use of the Doctrine of Discovery, which involves a nation “discovering” land and claiming the rights to that land. There are two significant elements of the Doctrine that directly relate to the claim of Native lands; these elements are Christianity and Civilization. The Doctrine involved non-Christian peoples not having the same rights to lands as Christians. As Indigenous peoples were not Christian, Europeans used that as justification to declare rights to Indigenous lands. Europeans saw Indigenous peoples as ‘uncivilized savages’; therefore, civilization was a crucial aspect of the Discovery. The Europeans believed God intended them to bring civilization to the Indigenous peoples and their lands.

Impact on native populations

From the 16th through the 19th centuries, the population of Native Americans sharply declined. Most mainstream scholars believe that, among the various contributing factors, epidemic disease (e.g. smallpox) was the overwhelming cause of the population decline of the Native Americans because of their lack of immunity to new diseases brought from Europe. It is difficult to estimate the number of pre-Columbian Native Americans who were living in what is today the United States of America. Estimates ranged from a low of 720,000 (Kroeber 1939) to a high of 15 million (Dobyns 1983), with a reanalysis estimating 5.65 million (Thornton 1990). By 1800, the Native population of the present-day United States had declined to approximately 600,000, and only 250,000 Native Americans remained in the 1890s. Chicken pox and measles, endemic but rarely fatal among Europeans (long after being introduced from Asia), often proved deadly to Native Americans. In the 100 years following the arrival of the Spanish to the Americas, large disease epidemics depopulated large parts of the eastern United States in the 16th century.

There are a number of documented cases where diseases were deliberately spread among Native Americans as a form of biological warfare. The most well-known example occurred in 1763, when Henry Bouquet (then serving as commander of Fort Pitt) distributed smallpox blankets to Native Americans besieging the fortification; the effectiveness of the attempt is unclear. In 1837, Mandan Native Americans at Fort Clark fell victim to a smallpox epidemic; some scholars have claimed they were intentionally infected with smallpox blankets.

In 1634, Andrew White of the Society of Jesus established a mission in what is now the state of Maryland, and the purpose of the mission, stated through an interpreter to the chief of an Indian tribe there, was "to extend civilization and instruction to his ignorant race, and show them the way to heaven". White's diaries report that by 1640, a community had been founded which they named St. Mary's, and the Indians were sending their children there "to be educated among the English". This included the daughter of the Piscataway Indian chief Tayac, which exemplifies not only a school for Indians, but either a school for girls or an early co-ed school. The same records report that in 1677, "a school for humanities was opened by our Society in the centre of [Maryland], directed by two of the Fathers; and the native youth, applying themselves assiduously to study, made good progress. Maryland and the recently established school sent two boys to St. Omer who yielded in abilities to few Europeans, when competing for the honor of being first in their class. So that not gold, nor silver, nor the other products of the earth alone, but men also are gathered from thence to bring those regions, which foreigners have unjustly called ferocious, to a higher state of virtue and cultivation."

Through the mid-17th century the Beaver Wars were fought over the fur trade between the Iroquois and the Hurons, the northern Algonquians, and their French allies. During the war the Iroquois destroyed several large tribal confederacies, including the Huron, Neutral, Erie, Susquehannock, and Shawnee, and became dominant in the region and enlarged their territory.

In 1727, the Sisters of the Order of Saint Ursula founded Ursuline Academy in New Orleans, which is currently the oldest continuously operating school for girls and the oldest Catholic school in the United States. From the time of its foundation, it offered the first classes for Native American girls, and would later offer classes for female African-American slaves and free women of color.

Between 1754 and 1763, many Native American tribes were involved in the French and Indian War/Seven Years' War. Those involved in the fur trade tended to ally with French forces against British colonial militias. The British had made fewer allies, but it was joined by some tribes that wanted to prove assimilation and loyalty in support of treaties to preserve their territories. They were often disappointed when such treaties were later overturned. The tribes had their own purposes, using their alliances with the European powers to battle traditional Native enemies. Some Iroquois who were loyal to the British, and helped them fight in the American Revolution, fled north into Canada.

After European explorers reached the West Coast in the 1770s, smallpox rapidly killed at least 30% of Northwest Coast Native Americans. For the next eighty to one hundred years, smallpox and other diseases devastated native populations in the region. Puget Sound area populations, once estimated as high as 37,000 people, were reduced to only 9,000 survivors by the time settlers arrived en masse in the mid-19th century.

Smallpox epidemics in 1780–1782 and 1837–1838 brought devastation and drastic depopulation among the Plains Indians. By 1832, the federal government established a smallpox vaccination program for Native Americans (The Indian Vaccination Act of 1832). It was the first federal program created to address a health problem of Native Americans.

Animal introductions
With the meeting of two worlds, animals, insects, and plants were carried from one to the other, both deliberately and by chance, in what is called the Columbian Exchange. In the 16th century, Spaniards and other Europeans brought horses to Mexico. Some of the horses escaped and began to breed and increase their numbers in the wild. As Native Americans adopted use of the animals, they began to change their cultures in substantial ways, especially by extending their nomadic ranges for hunting. The reintroduction of the horse to North America had a profound impact on Native American culture of the Great Plains.

17th century

King Philip's War

King Philip's War, also called Metacom's War or Metacom's Rebellion, was the last major armed conflict between Native American inhabitants of present-day southern New England and English colonists and their Native American allies from 1675 to 1676. It continued in northern New England (primarily on the Maine frontier) even after King Philip was killed, until a treaty was signed at Casco Bay in April 1678.

18th century

Natural society

Some European philosophers considered Native American societies to be truly "natural" and representative of a golden age known to them only in folk history.

American Revolution

During the American Revolution, the newly proclaimed United States competed with the British for the allegiance of Native American nations east of the Mississippi River. Most Native Americans who joined the struggle sided with the British, based both on their trading relationships and hopes that a United States defeat would result in a halt to further expansion onto Native American land. The first native community to sign a treaty with the new United States Government was the Lenape.

In 1779 the Sullivan Expedition was carried out during the American Revolutionary War against the British and the four allied nations of the Iroquois. George Washington gave orders that made it clear he wanted the Iroquois threat eliminated:

The British made peace with the Americans in the Treaty of Paris (1783), through which they ceded vast Native American territories to the United States without informing or consulting with the Native Americans.

United States
The United States was eager to expand, develop farming and settlements in new areas, and satisfy the land hunger of settlers from New England and new immigrants. The national government initially sought to purchase Native American land by treaties. The states and settlers were frequently at odds with this policy.

United States policy toward Native Americans continued to evolve after the American Revolution. George Washington and Henry Knox believed that Native Americans were equals but that their society was inferior. Washington formulated a policy to encourage the "civilizing" process. Washington had a six-point plan for civilization which included:

 impartial justice toward Native Americans
 regulated buying of Native American lands
 promotion of commerce
 promotion of experiments to civilize or improve Native American society
 presidential authority to give presents
 punishing those who violated Native American rights.

In the late 18th century, reformers, starting with Washington and Knox, supported educating native both children and adults, in efforts to "civilize" or otherwise assimilate Native Americans into the larger society (as opposed to relegating them to reservations). The Civilization Fund Act of 1819 promoted this civilization policy by providing funding to societies (mostly religious) who worked towards Native American improvement.

19th century

The population of California Indians was reduced by 90% during the 19th century—from more than 250,000 to 200,000 in the early 19th century to approximately 15,000 at the end of the century, mostly due to disease. Epidemics swept through California Indian Country, such as the 1833 malaria epidemic. The population went into decline as a result of the Spanish authorities forcing Native Californians to live in the missions where they contracted diseases from which they had little immunity. Cook estimates that 15,250 or 45% of the population decrease in the Missions was caused by disease. Two epidemics of measles, one in 1806 and the other in 1828, caused many deaths. The mortality rates were so high that the missions were constantly dependent upon new conversions. During the California Gold Rush, many natives were killed by incoming settlers as well as by militia units financed and organized by the California government. Some scholars contend that the state financing of these militias, as well as the US government's role in other massacres in California, such as the Bloody Island and Yontoket Massacres, in which up to 400 or more natives were killed in each massacre, constitutes a campaign of genocide against the Indigenous peoples of California.

Westward expansion

As American expansion continued, Native Americans resisted settlers' encroachment in several regions of the new nation (and in unorganized territories), from the Northwest to the Southeast, and then in the West, as settlers encountered the Native American tribes of the Great Plains. East of the Mississippi River, an intertribal army led by Tecumseh, a Shawnee chief, fought a number of engagements in the Northwest during the period 1811–1812, known as Tecumseh's War. During the War of 1812, Tecumseh's forces allied themselves with the British. After Tecumseh's death, the British ceased to aid the Native Americans south and west of Upper Canada and American expansion proceeded with little resistance. Conflicts in the Southeast include the Creek War and Seminole Wars, both before and after the Indian removals of most members of the Five Civilized Tribes.

In the 1830s, President Andrew Jackson signed the Indian Removal Act of 1830, a policy of relocating Indians from their homelands to Indian Territory and reservations in surrounding areas to open their lands for non-native settlements. This resulted in the Trail of Tears.

In July 1845, the New York newspaper editor John L. O'Sullivan coined the phrase, "Manifest Destiny", as the "design of Providence" supporting the territorial expansion of the United States. Manifest Destiny had serious consequences for Native Americans, since continental expansion for the U.S. took place at the cost of their occupied land. A justification for the policy of conquest and subjugation of the Indigenous people emanated from the stereotyped perceptions of all Native Americans as "merciless Indian savages" (as described in the United States Declaration of Independence). Sam Wolfson in The Guardian writes, "The declaration's passage has often been cited as an encapsulation of the dehumanizing attitude toward Indigenous Americans that the US was founded on."

The Indian Appropriations Act of 1851 set the precedent for modern-day Native American reservations through allocating funds to move western tribes onto reservations since there were no more lands available for relocation.

Native American nations on the plains in the west continued armed conflicts with the U.S. throughout the 19th century, through what were called generally Indian Wars. Notable conflicts in this period include the Dakota War, Great Sioux War, Snake War, Colorado War, and Texas-Indian Wars. Expressing the frontier anti-Indian sentiment, Theodore Roosevelt believed the Indians were destined to vanish under the pressure of white civilization, stating in an 1886 lecture:

One of the last and most notable events during the Indian wars was the Wounded Knee Massacre in 1890. In the years leading up to it the U.S. government had continued to seize Lakota lands. A Ghost Dance ritual on the Northern Lakota reservation at Wounded Knee, South Dakota, led to the U.S. Army's attempt to subdue the Lakota. The dance was part of a religious movement founded by the Northern Paiute spiritual leader Wovoka that told of the return of the Messiah to relieve the suffering of Native Americans and promised that if they would live righteous lives and perform the Ghost Dance properly, the European American colonists would vanish, the bison would return, and the living and the dead would be reunited in an Edenic world. On December 29 at Wounded Knee, gunfire erupted, and U.S. soldiers killed up to 300 Indians, mostly old men, women, and children.

Civil War

Native Americans served in both the Union and Confederate military during the American Civil War. At the outbreak of the war, for example, the minority party of the Cherokee gave its allegiance to the Confederacy, while originally the majority party went for the North. Native Americans fought knowing they might jeopardize their independence, unique cultures, and ancestral lands if they ended up on the losing side of the Civil War. 28,693 Native Americans served in the Union and Confederate armies during the Civil War, participating in battles such as Pea Ridge, Second Manassas, Antietam, Spotsylvania, Cold Harbor, and in federal assaults on Petersburg. A few Native American tribes, such as the Creek and the Choctaw, were slaveholders and found a political and economic commonality with the Confederacy. The Choctaw owned over 2,000 slaves.

Removals and reservations

In the 19th century, the incessant westward expansion of the United States incrementally compelled large numbers of Native Americans to resettle further west, often by force, almost always reluctantly. Native Americans believed this forced relocation illegal, given the Treaty of Hopewell of 1785. Under President Andrew Jackson, United States Congress passed the Indian Removal Act of 1830, which authorized the President to conduct treaties to exchange Native American land east of the Mississippi River for lands west of the river.

As many as 100,000 Native Americans relocated to the West as a result of this Indian removal policy. In theory, relocation was supposed to be voluntary and many Native Americans did remain in the East. In practice, great pressure was put on Native American leaders to sign removal treaties. The most egregious violation, the Trail of Tears, was the removal of the Cherokee by President Jackson to Indian Territory. In 1864, 9,000 Navajos were forced by the U.S. government to an internment camp in Bosque Redondo, where, under armed guards, up to 3,500 Navajo and Mescalero Apache men, women, and children died from starvation and disease over the next 4 years. The interned Navajo were allowed to return to their ancestral homeland in 1868.

Native Americans and U.S. citizenship
In 1817, the Cherokee became the first Native Americans recognized as U.S. citizens. Under Article 8 of the 1817 Cherokee treaty, "Upwards of 300 Cherokees (Heads of Families) in the honest simplicity of their souls, made an election to become American citizens".

Factors establishing citizenship included:
 Treaty provision (as with the Cherokee)
 Registration and land allotment under the Dawes Act of February 8, 1887
 Issuance of patent in fee simple
 Adopting habits of civilized life
 Minor children
 Citizenship by birth
 Becoming soldiers and sailors in the U.S. Armed Forces
 Marriage to a U.S. citizen
 Special act of Congress.

After the American Civil War, the Civil Rights Act of 1866 states, "that all persons born in the United States, and not subject to any foreign power, excluding Indians not taxed, are hereby declared to be citizens of the United States".

Indian Appropriations Act of 1871
In 1871, Congress added a rider to the Indian Appropriations Act, signed into law by President Ulysses S. Grant, ending United States recognition of additional Native American tribes or independent nations, and prohibiting additional treaties.

Historical education

After the Indian wars in the late 19th century, the government established Native American boarding schools, initially run primarily by or affiliated with Christian missionaries. At this time, American society thought that Native American children needed to be acculturated to the general society. The boarding school experience was a total immersion in modern American society, but it could prove traumatic to children, who were forbidden to speak their Native languages. They were taught Christianity and not allowed to practice their native religions, and in numerous other ways forced to abandon their Native American identities.

Before the 1930s, schools on the reservations provided no schooling beyond the sixth grade. To obtain more, boarding school was usually necessary. Small reservations with a few hundred people usually sent their children to nearby public schools. The "Indian New Deal" of the 1930s closed many of the boarding schools, and downplayed the assimilationist goals. The Indian Division of the Civilian Conservation Corps operated large-scale construction projects on the reservations, building thousands of new schools and community buildings. Under the leadership of John Collier the Bureau of Indian Affairs (BIA) brought in progressive educators to reshape Indian education. The BIA by 1938 taught 30,000 students in 377 boarding and day schools, or 40% of all Indian children in school. The Navajo largely opposed schooling of any sort, but the other tribes accepted the system. There were now high schools on larger reservations, educating not only teenagers but also an adult audience. There were no Indian facilities for higher education. They deemphasized textbooks, emphasized self-esteem, and started teaching Indian history. They promoted traditional arts and crafts of the sort that could be conducted on the reservations, such as making jewelry. The New Deal reformers met significant resistance from parents and teachers, and had mixed results. World War II brought younger Indians in contact with the broader society through military service and work in the munitions industries. The role of schooling was changed to focus on vocational education for jobs in urban America.

Since the rise of self-determination for Native Americans, they have generally emphasized education of their children at schools near where they live. In addition, many federally recognized tribes have taken over operations of such schools and added programs of language retention and revival to strengthen their cultures. Beginning in the 1970s, tribes have also founded colleges at their reservations, controlled, and operated by Native Americans, to educate their young for jobs as well as to pass on their cultures.

20th century

On August 29, 1911, Ishi, generally considered to have been the last Native American to live most of his life without contact with European-American culture, was discovered near Oroville, California.

In 1919, the United States under President Woodrow Wilson granted citizenship to all Native Americans who had served in World War I. Nearly 10,000 men had enlisted and served, a high number in relation to their population. Despite this, in many areas Native Americans faced local resistance when they tried to vote and were discriminated against with barriers to voter registration.

On June 2, 1924, U.S. President Republican Calvin Coolidge signed the Indian Citizenship Act, which made all Native Americans born in the United States and its territories American citizens. Prior to passage of the act, nearly two-thirds of Native Americans were already U.S. citizens, through marriage, military service or accepting land allotments. The Act extended citizenship to "all non-citizen Indians born within the territorial limits of the United States".

Republican Charles Curtis, a Congressman and longtime U.S. Senator from Kansas, was of Kaw, Osage, Potawatomi, and European ancestry. After serving as a United States Representative and being repeatedly re-elected as United States Senator from Kansas, Curtis served as Senate Minority Whip for 10 years and as Senate Majority Leader for five years. He was very influential in the Senate. In 1928, he ran as the vice presidential candidate with Herbert Hoover for president, and served from 1929 to 1933. He was the first person with significant Native American ancestry and the first person with acknowledged non-European ancestry to be elected to either of the highest offices in the land.

American Indians today in the United States have all the rights guaranteed in the U.S. Constitution, can vote in elections, and run for political office. Controversies remain over how much the federal government has jurisdiction over tribal affairs, sovereignty, and cultural practices.

Mid-century, the Indian termination policy and the Indian Relocation Act of 1956 marked a new direction for assimilating Native Americans into urban life.

The census counted 332,000 Indians in 1930 and 334,000 in 1940, including those on and off reservations in the 48 states. Total spending on Indians averaged $38 million a year in the late 1920s, dropping to a low of $23 million in 1933, and returning to $38 million in 1940.

World War II

Some 44,000 Native Americans served in the U.S. military during World War II: at the time, one-third of all able-bodied Indian men from eighteen to fifty years of age. Described as the first large-scale exodus of Indigenous peoples from the reservations since the removals of the 19th century, the men's service with the U.S. military in the international conflict was a turning point in Native American history. The overwhelming majority of Native Americans welcomed the opportunity to serve; they had a voluntary enlistment rate that was 40% higher than those drafted.

Their fellow soldiers often held them in high esteem, in part since the legend of the tough Native American warrior had become a part of the fabric of American historical legend. White servicemen sometimes showed a lighthearted respect toward Native American comrades by calling them "chief". The resulting increase in contact with the world outside of the reservation system brought profound changes to Native American culture. "The war", said the U.S. Indian Commissioner in 1945, "caused the greatest disruption of Native life since the beginning of the reservation era", affecting the habits, views, and economic well-being of tribal members. The most significant of these changes was the opportunity—as a result of wartime labor shortages—to find well-paying work in cities, and many people relocated to urban areas, particularly on the West Coast with the buildup of the defense industry.

There were also losses as a result of the war. For instance, a total of 1,200 Pueblo men served in World War II; only about half came home alive. In addition, many more Navajo served as code talkers for the military in the Pacific. The code they made, although cryptographically very simple, was never cracked by the Japanese.

Self-determination

Military service and urban residency contributed to the rise of American Indian activism, particularly after the 1960s and the occupation of Alcatraz Island (1969–1971) by a student Indian group from San Francisco. In the same period, the American Indian Movement (AIM) was founded in Minneapolis, and chapters were established throughout the country, where American Indians combined spiritual and political activism. Political protests gained national media attention and the sympathy of the American public.

Through the mid-1970s, conflicts between governments and Native Americans occasionally erupted into violence. A notable late 20th-century event was the Wounded Knee incident on the Pine Ridge Indian Reservation. Upset with tribal government and the failures of the federal government to enforce treaty rights, about 300 Oglala Lakota and AIM activists took control of Wounded Knee on February 27, 1973.

Indian activists from around the country joined them at Pine Ridge, and the occupation became a symbol of rising American Indian identity and power. Federal law enforcement officials and the national guard cordoned off the town, and the two sides had a standoff for 71 days. During much gunfire, one United States Marshal was wounded and paralyzed. In late April, a Cherokee and local Lakota man were killed by gunfire; the Lakota elders ended the occupation to ensure no more people died.

In June 1975, two FBI agents seeking to make an armed robbery arrest at Pine Ridge Reservation were wounded in a firefight, and killed at close range. The AIM activist Leonard Peltier was sentenced in 1976 to two consecutive terms of life in prison for the FBI deaths.

In 1968, the government enacted the Indian Civil Rights Act. This gave tribal members most of the protections against abuses by tribal governments that the Bill of Rights accords to all U.S. citizens with respect to the federal government. In 1975, the U.S. government passed the Indian Self-Determination and Education Assistance Act, marking the culmination of fifteen years of policy changes. It resulted from American Indian activism, the Civil Rights Movement, and community development aspects of President Lyndon Johnson's social programs of the 1960s. The Act recognized the right and need of Native Americans for self-determination. It marked the U.S. government's turn away from the 1950s policy of termination of the relationship between tribes and the government. The U.S. government encouraged Native Americans' efforts at self-government and determining their futures. Tribes have developed organizations to administer their own social, welfare and housing programs, for instance. Tribal self-determination has created tension with respect to the federal government's historic trust obligation to care for Indians; however, the Bureau of Indian Affairs has never lived up to that responsibility.

Tribal colleges

Navajo Community College, now called Diné College, the first tribal college, was founded in Tsaile, Arizona, in 1968 and accredited in 1979. Tensions immediately arose between two philosophies: one that the tribal colleges should have the same criteria, curriculum and procedures for educational quality as mainstream colleges, the other that the faculty and curriculum should be closely adapted to the particular historical culture of the tribe. There was a great deal of turnover, exacerbated by very tight budgets. In 1994, the U.S. Congress passed legislation recognizing the tribal colleges as land-grant colleges, which provided opportunities for large-scale funding. Thirty-two tribal colleges in the United States belong to the American Indian Higher Education Consortium. By the early 21st century, tribal nations had also established numerous language revival programs in their schools.

In addition, Native American activism has led major universities across the country to establish Native American studies programs and departments, increasing awareness of the strengths of Indian cultures, providing opportunities for academics, and deepening research on history and cultures in the United States. Native Americans have entered academia; journalism and media; politics at local, state and federal levels; and public service, for instance, influencing medical research and policy to identify issues related to American Indians.

21st century

In 2009, an "apology to Native Peoples of the United States" was included in the Defense Appropriations Act. It stated that the U.S. "apologizes on behalf of the people of the United States to all Native Peoples for the many instances of violence, maltreatment, and neglect inflicted on Native Peoples by citizens of the United States".

In 2013, jurisdiction over persons who were not tribal members under the Violence Against Women Act was extended to Indian Country. This closed a gap which prevented arrest or prosecution by tribal police or courts of abusive partners of tribal members who were not native or from another tribe.

Migration of Native Americans to urban areas continued to grow up from 8% in 1940 to 45% in 1970 and up to 70% in 2012. Urban areas with significant Native American populations include Phoenix, Tulsa, Minneapolis, Denver, Albuquerque, Tucson, Chicago, Oklahoma City, Houston, New York City, Los Angeles, and Rapid City. Many live in poverty. Racism, unemployment, drugs, and gangs were common problems that Indian social service organizations such as the Little Earth housing complex in Minneapolis attempt to address. Grassroots efforts to support urban Indigenous populations have also taken place, as in the case of Bringing the Circle Together in Los Angeles.

In 2020, Congress passed a law to transition the management of a bison range on over 18,000 acres of undeveloped land in northwest Montana from the U.S. Fish and Wildlife Service to the Confederated Salish and Kootenai Tribes. In the 1900s these lands were taken by the U.S. government and the bison were depleted without the consent of the Confederated Salish and Kootenai Tribes. Secretary Interior Deb Haaland celebrated this transition at the Salish Kootenai College on May 21, 2022, calling it "a return to something pure and sacred."

Demographics

According to the 2020 Census, the U.S. population was 331.4 million. Of this, 3.7 million people, or 1.1 percent, reported American Indian or Alaska Native ancestry alone. In addition, 2.2 million people (0.6 percent), reported American Indian or Alaska Native in combination with one or more other races.

The definition of American Indian or Alaska Native used in the 2010 census was as follows:

According to Office of Management and Budget, "American Indian or Alaska Native" refers to a person having origins in any of the original peoples of North and South America (including Central America) and who maintains tribal affiliation or community attachment.

The 2010 census permitted respondents to self-identify as being of one or more races. Self-identification dates from the census of 1960; prior to that the race of the respondent was determined by the opinion of the census taker. The option to select more than one race was introduced in 2000. If American Indian or Alaska Native was selected, the form requested the individual provide the name of the "enrolled or principal tribe".

Population since 1880
Censuses counted around 345,000 Native Americans in 1880, around 274,000 in 1890 (including 25,000 in Alaska), 332,000 in 1930 and 334,000 in 1940, including those on and off reservations in the 48 states. Native American population rebounded sharply from 1950, when they numbered 343,410; it reached 523,591 in 1960, 792,730 in 1970, with an annual growth rate of 5%, four times the national average. Total spending on Native Americans averaged $38 million a year in the late 1920s, dropping to a low of $23 million in 1933, and returning to $38 million in 1940.

Population distribution

78% of Native Americans live outside a reservation. Full-blood individuals are more likely to live on a reservation than mixed-blood individuals. The Navajo, with 286,000 full-blood individuals, is the largest tribe if only full-blood individuals are counted; the Navajo are the tribe with the highest proportion of full-blood individuals, 86.3%. The Cherokee have a different history; it is the largest tribe, with 819,000 individuals, and it has 284,000 full-blood individuals.

Urban migration

As of 2012, 70% of Native Americans live in urban areas, up from 45% in 1970 and 8% in 1940. Urban areas with significant Native American populations include Minneapolis, Denver, Phoenix, Tucson, Chicago, Oklahoma City, Houston, New York City, and Los Angeles. Many live in poverty. Racism, unemployment, drugs and gangs are common problems which Indian social service organizations such as the Little Earth housing complex in Minneapolis attempt to address.

Population by tribal grouping
Below are numbers for U.S. citizens self-identifying to selected tribal groupings, according to the 2010 U.S. census.

Tribal sovereignty

There are 573 federally recognized tribal governments and 326 Indian reservations in the United States. These tribes possess the right to form their own governments, to enforce laws (both civil and criminal) within their lands, to tax, to establish requirements for membership, to license and regulate activities, to zone, and to exclude persons from tribal territories. Limitations on tribal powers of self-government include the same limitations applicable to states; for example, neither tribes nor states have the power to make war, engage in foreign relations, or coin money (this includes paper currency). In addition, there are a number of tribes that are recognized by individual states, but not by the federal government. The rights and benefits associated with state recognition vary from state to state.

Many Native Americans and advocates of Native American rights point out that the U.S. federal government's claim to recognize the "sovereignty" of Native American peoples falls short, given that the United States wishes to govern Native American peoples and treat them as subject to U.S. law. Such advocates contend that full respect for Native American sovereignty would require the U.S. government to deal with Native American peoples in the same manner as any other sovereign nation, handling matters related to relations with Native Americans through the Secretary of State, rather than the Bureau of Indian Affairs. Many Native Americans and advocates of Native American rights believe that it is condescending for such lands to be considered "held in trust" and regulated in any fashion by any entity other than their own tribes.

Some tribal groups have been unable to document the cultural continuity required for federal recognition. To achieve federal recognition and its benefits, tribes must prove continuous existence since 1900. The federal government has maintained this requirement, in part because through participation on councils and committees, federally recognized tribes have been adamant about groups' satisfying the same requirements as they did. The Muwekma Ohlone of the San Francisco Bay Area are pursuing litigation in the federal court system to establish recognition. Many of the smaller eastern tribes, long considered remnants of extinct peoples, have been trying to gain official recognition of their tribal status. Several tribes in Virginia and North Carolina have gained state recognition. Federal recognition confers some benefits, including the right to label arts and crafts as Native American and permission to apply for grants that are specifically reserved for Native Americans. But gaining federal recognition as a tribe is extremely difficult; to be established as a tribal group, members have to submit extensive genealogical proof of tribal descent and continuity of the tribe as a culture.

In July 2000, the Washington State Republican Party adopted a resolution recommending that the federal and legislative branches of the U.S. government terminate tribal governments. In 2007, a group of Democratic Party congressmen and congresswomen introduced a bill in the U.S. House of Representatives to "terminate" the Cherokee Nation. This was related to their voting to exclude Cherokee Freedmen as members of the tribe unless they had a Cherokee ancestor on the Dawes Rolls, although all Cherokee Freedmen and their descendants had been members since 1866.

As of 2004, various Native Americans are wary of attempts by others to gain control of their reservation lands for natural resources, such as coal and uranium in the West.

The State of Maine is the only State House Legislature that allows Representatives from Indian Tribes. The three nonvoting members represent the Penobscot Nation, Houlton Band of Maliseet Indians, and Passamaquoddy Tribe. These representatives can sponsor any legislation regarding American Indian affairs or co-sponsor any pending State of Maine legislation. Maine is unique regarding Indigenous leadership representation.

In the state of Virginia, Native Americans face a unique problem. Until 2017 Virginia previously had no federally recognized tribes but the state had recognized eight. This is related historically to the greater impact of disease and warfare on the Virginia Indian populations, as well as their intermarriage with Europeans and Africans. Some people confused ancestry with culture, but groups of Virginia Indians maintained their cultural continuity. Most of their early reservations were ended under the pressure of early European settlement.

Some historians also note the problems of Virginia Indians in establishing documented continuity of identity, due to the work of Walter Ashby Plecker (1912–1946). As registrar of the state's Bureau of Vital Statistics, he applied his own interpretation of the one-drop rule, enacted in law in 1924 as the state's Racial Integrity Act. It recognized only two races: "white" and "colored".

Plecker, a segregationist, believed that the state's Native Americans had been "mongrelized" by intermarriage with African Americans; to him, ancestry determined identity, rather than culture. He thought that some people of partial black ancestry were trying to "pass" as Native Americans. Plecker thought that anyone with any African heritage had to be classified as colored, regardless of appearance, amount of European or Native American ancestry, and cultural/community identification. Plecker pressured local governments into reclassifying all Native Americans in the state as "colored" and gave them lists of family surnames to examine for reclassification based on his interpretation of data and the law. This led to the state's destruction of accurate records related to families and communities who identified as Native American (as in church records and daily life). By his actions, sometimes different members of the same family were split by being classified as "white" or "colored". He did not allow people to enter their primary identification as Native American in state records. In 2009, the Senate Indian Affairs Committee endorsed a bill that would grant federal recognition to tribes in Virginia.

, the largest groups in the United States by population were Navajo, Cherokee, Choctaw, Sioux, Chippewa, Apache, Blackfeet, Iroquois, and Pueblo. In 2000, eight of ten Americans with Native American ancestry were of mixed ancestry. It is estimated that by 2100 that figure will rise to nine out of ten.

Civil rights movement

The civil rights movement was a very significant moment for the rights of Native Americans and other people of color. Native Americans faced racism and prejudice for hundreds of years, and this increased after the American Civil War. Native Americans, like African Americans, were subjected to the Jim Crow Laws and segregation in the Deep South especially after they were made citizens through the Indian Citizenship Act of 1924. As a body of law, Jim Crow institutionalized economic, educational, and social disadvantages for Native Americans, and other people of color living in the south. Native American identity was especially targeted by a system that only wanted to recognize white or colored, and the government began to question the legitimacy of some tribes because they had intermarried with African Americans. Native Americans were also discriminated and discouraged from voting in the southern and western states.

In the south segregation was a major problem for Native Americans seeking education, but the NAACP's legal strategy would later change this. Movements such as Brown v. Board of Education was a major victory for the Civil Rights Movement headed by the NAACP, and inspired Native Americans to start participating in the Civil Rights Movement. Martin Luther King Jr. began assisting Native Americans in the south in the late 1950s after they reached out to him. At that time the remaining Creek in Alabama were trying to completely desegregate schools in their area. In this case, light-complexioned Native children were allowed to ride school buses to previously all white schools, while dark-skinned Native children from the same band were barred from riding the same buses. Tribal leaders, upon hearing of King's desegregation campaign in Birmingham, Alabama, contacted him for assistance. He promptly responded and, through his intervention, the problem was quickly resolved. King would later make trips to Arizona visiting Native Americans on reservations, and in churches encouraging them to be involved in the Civil Rights Movement. In King's book Why We Can't Wait he writes:

Our nation was born in genocide when it embraced the doctrine that the original American, the Indian, was an inferior race. Even before there were large numbers of Negroes on our shores, the scar of racial hatred had already disfigured colonial society. From the sixteenth century forward, blood flowed in battles over racial supremacy. We are perhaps the only nation which tried as a matter of national policy to wipe out its Indigenous population. Moreover, we elevated that tragic experience into a noble crusade. Indeed, even today we have not permitted ourselves to reject or to feel remorse for this shameful episode. Our literature, our films, our drama, our folklore all exalt it.

Native Americans would then actively participate and support the NAACP, and the civil rights movement. The National Indian Youth Council (NIYC) would soon rise in 1961 to fight for Native American rights during the Civil Rights Movement, and were strong King supporters. During the 1963 March on Washington there was a sizable Native American contingent, including many from South Dakota, and many from the Navajo nation. Native Americans also participated the Poor People's Campaign in 1968. The NIYC were very active supporters of the Poor People's Campaign unlike the National Congress of American Indians (NCAI); the NIYC and other Native organizations met with King in March 1968 but the NCAI disagreed on how to approach the anti-poverty campaign; the NCAI decided against participating in the march. The NCAI wished to pursue their battles in the courts and with Congress, unlike the NIYC. The NAACP also inspired the creation of the Native American Rights Fund (NARF) which was patterned after the NAACP's Legal Defense and Education Fund. Furthermore, the NAACP continued to organize to stop mass incarceration and end the criminalization of Native Americans and other communities of people of color. The following is an excerpt from a statement from Mel Thom on May 1, 1968, during a meeting with Secretary of State Dean Rusk: (It was written by members of the Workshop on American Indian Affairs and the NIYC)

Contemporary issues

Native American struggles amid poverty to maintain life on the reservation or in larger society have resulted in a variety of health issues, some related to nutrition and health practices. The community suffers a vulnerability to and disproportionately high rate of alcoholism.

Recent studies also point to rising rates of stroke, heart disease, and diabetes in the Native American population.

Societal discrimination and racism

In a study conducted in 2006–2007, non-Native Americans admitted they rarely encountered Native Americans in their daily lives. While sympathetic toward Native Americans and expressing regret over the past, most people had only a vague understanding of the problems facing Native Americans today. For their part, Native Americans told researchers that they believed they continued to face prejudice, mistreatment, and inequality in the broader society.

Affirmative action issues
Federal contractors and subcontractors, such as businesses and educational institutions, are legally required to adopt equal opportunity employment and affirmative action measures intended to prevent discrimination against employees or applicants for employment on the basis of "color, religion, sex, or national origin". For this purpose, a Native American is defined as "A person having origins in any of the original peoples of North and South America (including Central America), and who maintains a tribal affiliation or community attachment". The passing of the Indian Relocation Act saw a 56% increase in Native American city dwellers over 40 years. The Native American urban poverty rate exceeds that of reservation poverty rates due to discrimination in hiring processes. However, self-reporting is permitted: "Educational institutions and other recipients should allow students and staff to self-identify their race and ethnicity unless self-identification is not practicable or feasible."

Self-reporting opens the door to "box checking" by people who, despite not having a substantial relationship to Native American culture, innocently or fraudulently check the box for Native American.

The difficulties that Native Americans face in the workforce, for example, a lack of promotions and wrongful terminations are attributed to racial stereotypes and implicit biases. Native American business owners are seldom offered auxiliary resources that are crucial for entrepreneurial success.

Native American mascots in sports

American Indian activists in the United States and Canada have criticized the use of Native American mascots in sports, as perpetuating stereotypes. This is considered cultural appropriation.
There has been a steady decline in the number of secondary school and college teams using such names, images, and mascots. Some tribal team names have been approved by the tribe in question, such as the Seminole Tribe of Florida's approving use of their name for the teams of Florida State University.
Among professional teams, the NBA's Golden State Warriors discontinued use of Native American-themed logos in 1971. The NFL's Washington Commanders, formerly the Washington Redskins, changed their name in 2020, as the term is considered to be a racial slur.

MLB's Cleveland Guardians were formerly known as the Cleveland Indians. Their use of a caricature called Chief Wahoo faced protest for decades. Starting in 2019, Chief Wahoo ceased to be a logo for Cleveland Indians, though Chief Wahoo merchandise could still be sold in the Cleveland-area. On December 13, 2020, The New York Times reported that Cleveland would be officially changing their name. On November 19, 2021, the team officially became the Cleveland Guardians.

Historical depictions in art

Native Americans have been depicted by American artists in various ways at different periods. A number of 19th- and 20th-century United States and Canadian painters, often motivated by a desire to document and preserve Native culture, specialized in Native American subjects. Among the most prominent of these were Elbridge Ayer Burbank, George Catlin, Seth Eastman, Paul Kane, W. Langdon Kihn, Charles Bird King, Joseph Henry Sharp, and John Mix Stanley.

In the 20th century, early portrayals of Native Americans in movies and television roles were first performed by European Americans dressed in mock traditional attire. Examples included The Last of the Mohicans (1920), Hawkeye and the Last of the Mohicans (1957), and F Troop (1965–67). In later decades, Native American actors such as Jay Silverheels in The Lone Ranger television series (1949–57) came to prominence. The roles of Native Americans were limited and not reflective of Native American culture. By the 1970s some Native American film roles began to show more complexity, such as those in Little Big Man (1970), Billy Jack (1971), and The Outlaw Josey Wales (1976), which depicted Native Americans in minor supporting roles.

For years, Native people on U.S. television were relegated to secondary, subordinate roles. During the years of the series Bonanza (1959–1973), no major or secondary Native characters appeared on a consistent basis. The series The Lone Ranger (1949–1957), Cheyenne (1955–1963), and Law of the Plainsman (1959–1963) had Native characters who were essentially aides to the central white characters. This continued in such series as How the West Was Won. These programs resembled the "sympathetic" yet contradictory film Dances With Wolves of 1990, in which, according to Ella Shohat and Robert Stam, the narrative choice was to relate the Lakota story as told through a Euro-American voice, for wider impact among a general audience.
Like the 1992 remake of The Last of the Mohicans and Geronimo: An American Legend (1993), Dances with Wolves employed a number of Native American actors, and made an effort to portray Indigenous languages. In 1996, Plains Cree actor Michael Greyeyes would play renowned Native American warrior Crazy Horse in the 1996 television film Crazy Horse, and would also later play renowned Sioux chief Sitting Bull in the 2017 movie Woman Walks Ahead.

The 1998 film Smoke Signals, which was set on the Coeur D'Alene Reservation and discussed hardships of present-day American Indian families living on reservations, featured numerous Native American actors as well. The film was the first feature film to be produced and directed by Native Americans, and was also the first feature to include an exclusive Native American cast. At the annual Sundance Film Festival, Smoke Signals would win the Audience Award and its producer Chris Eyre, an enrolled member of the Cheyenne and Arapaho Tribes of Oklahoma, would win the Filmmaker's Trophy. In 2009, We Shall Remain (2009), a television documentary by Ric Burns and part of the American Experience series, presented a five-episode series "from a Native American perspective". It represented "an unprecedented collaboration between Native and non-Native filmmakers and involves Native advisors and scholars at all levels of the project". The five episodes explore the impact of King Philip's War on the northeastern tribes, the "Native American confederacy" of Tecumseh's War, the U.S.-forced relocation of Southeastern tribes known as the Trail of Tears, the pursuit and capture of Geronimo and the Apache Wars, and concludes with the Wounded Knee incident, participation by the American Indian Movement, and the increasing resurgence of modern Native cultures since.

Terminology differences

The most common of the modern terms to refer to Indigenous peoples of the United States are Indians, American Indians, and Native Americans. Up to the early to mid 18th century, the term Americans was not applied to people of European heritage in North America. Instead it was equivalent to the term Indians. As people of European heritage began using the term Americans to refer instead to themselves, the word Indians became historically the most often employed term.

The term Indians, long laden with racist stereotypes, began to be widely replaced in the 1960s with the term Native Americans, which recognized the Indigeneity of the people who first made the Americas home. But as the term Native Americans became popular, the American Indian Movement saw pejorative connotations in the term native and reappropriated the term Indian, seeing it as witness to the history of violence against the many nations that lived in the Americas before European arrival.

The term Native American was introduced in the United States in preference to the older term Indian to distinguish the Indigenous peoples of the Americas from the people of India.

The term Amerindian, a portmanteau of "American Indian", was coined in 1902 by the American Anthropological Association. However, it has been controversial since its creation. It was immediately rejected by some leading members of the Association, and, while adopted by many, it was never universally accepted. While never popular in Indigenous communities themselves, it remains a preferred term among some anthropologists, notably in some parts of Canada and the English-speaking Caribbean.

During World War II, draft boards typically classified American Indians from Virginia as Negroes.

In 1995, a plurality of Indigenous Americans, however, preferred the term American Indian and many tribes include the word Indian in their formal title.

Criticism of the neologism Native American comes from diverse sources. Russell Means, an Oglala Lakota activist, opposed the term Native American because he believed it was imposed by the government without the consent of Native people.

A 1995 U.S. Census Bureau survey found that more Native Americans in the United States preferred American Indian to Native American. Most American Indians are comfortable with Indian, American Indian, and Native American. That term is reflected in the name chosen for the National Museum of the American Indian, which opened in 2004 on the Mall in Washington, DC.

Other commonly used terms are First Americans, First Nations, and Native Peoples.

Gambling industry

Gambling has become a leading industry. Casinos operated by many Native American governments in the United States are creating a stream of gambling revenue that some communities are beginning to leverage to build diversified economies. Although many Native American tribes have casinos, the impact of Native American gaming is widely debated. Some tribes, such as the Winnemem Wintu of Redding, California, feel that casinos and their proceeds destroy culture from the inside out. These tribes refuse to participate in the gambling industry.

Financial services
Numerous tribes around the country have entered the financial services market including the Otoe-Missouria, Tunica-Biloxi, and the Rosebud Sioux. Because of the challenges involved in starting a financial services business from scratch, many tribes hire outside consultants and vendors to help them launch these businesses and manage the regulatory issues involved.
Similar to the tribal sovereignty debates that occurred when tribes first entered the gaming industry, the tribes, states, and federal government are currently in disagreement regarding who possesses the authority to regulate these e-commerce business entities.

Crime on reservations
Prosecution of serious crime, historically endemic on reservations, was required by the 1885 Major Crimes Act, 18 U.S.C. §§1153, 3242, and court decisions to be investigated by the federal government, usually the Federal Bureau of Investigation, and prosecuted by United States Attorneys of the United States federal judicial district in which the reservation lies.

A December 13, 2009 New York Times article about growing gang violence on the Pine Ridge Indian Reservation estimated that there were 39 gangs with 5,000 members on that reservation alone. Navajo country recently reported 225 gangs in its territory.

As of 2012, a high incidence of rape continued to impact Native American women and Alaskan native women. According to the Department of Justice, 1 in 3 Native women have suffered rape or attempted rape, more than twice the national rate. About 46 percent of Native American women have been raped, beaten, or stalked by an intimate partner, according to a 2010 study by the Centers for Disease Control. According to Professor N. Bruce Duthu, "More than 80 percent of Indian victims identify their attacker as non-Indian".

Barriers to economic development 
Today, other than tribes successfully running casinos, many tribes struggle, as they are often located on reservations isolated from the main economic centers of the country. The estimated 2.1 million Native Americans are the most impoverished of all ethnic groups. According to the 2000 Census, an estimated 400,000 Native Americans reside on reservation land. While some tribes have had success with gaming, only 40% of the 562 federally recognized tribes operate casinos. According to a 2007 survey by the U.S. Small Business Administration, only 1% of Native Americans own and operate a business.

The barriers to economic development on Native American reservations have been identified by Joseph Kalt and Stephen Cornell of the Harvard Project on American Indian Economic Development at Harvard University, in their report: What Can Tribes Do? Strategies and Institutions in American Indian Economic Development (2008), are summarized as follows:
 Lack of access to capital
 Lack of human capital (education, skills, technical expertise) and the means to develop it
 Reservations lack effective planning
 Reservations are poor in natural resources
 Reservations have natural resources but lack sufficient control over them
 Reservations are disadvantaged by their distance from markets and the high costs of transportation
 Tribes cannot persuade investors to locate on reservations because of intense competition from non-Native American communities
 The Bureau of Indian Affairs is inept, corrupt or uninterested in reservation development
 Tribal politicians and bureaucrats are inept or corrupt
 On-reservation factionalism destroys stability in tribal decisions
 The instability of tribal government keeps outsiders from investing. The lack of international recognition Native American tribal sovereignty weakens their political-economic legitimacy. (Many tribes adopted constitutions by the 1934 Indian Reorganization Act model, with two-year terms for elected positions of chief and council members deemed too short by the authors for getting things done)
 Entrepreneurial skills and experience are scarce

A major barrier to development is the lack of entrepreneurial knowledge and experience within Indian reservations. "A general lack of education and experience about business is a significant challenge to prospective entrepreneurs", was the report on Native American entrepreneurship by the Northwest Area Foundation in 2004. "Native American communities that lack entrepreneurial traditions and recent experiences typically do not provide the support that entrepreneurs need to thrive. Consequently, experiential entrepreneurship education needs to be embedded into school curriculum and after-school and other community activities. This would allow students to learn the essential elements of entrepreneurship from a young age and encourage them to apply these elements throughout life".

Discourse in Native American economic development 
Some scholars argue that the existing theories and practices of economic development are not suitable for Native American communities—given the lifestyle, economic, and cultural differences, as well as the unique history of Native American-U.S. relations. Little economic development research has been conducted on Native American communities. The federal government fails to consider place-based issues of American Indian poverty by generalizing the demographic. In addition, the concept of economic development threatens to upend the multidimensionality of Native American culture. The dominance of federal government involvement in Indigenous developmental activities perpetuates and exacerbates the salvage paradigm.

Land ownership challenges 
Native land owned by individual Native Americans sometimes cannot be developed because of fractionalization. Fractionalization occurs when a landowner dies, and their land is inherited by their children, but not subdivided. This means that one parcel might be owned by 50 different individuals. A majority of those holding interest must agree to any proposal to develop the land, and establishing this consent is time-consuming, cumbersome, and sometimes impossible.
Another landownership issue on reservations is checkerboarding, where Tribal land is interspersed with land owned by the federal government on behalf of Natives, individually owned plots, and land owned by non-Native individuals. This prevents Tribal governments from securing plots of land large enough for economic development or agricultural uses. Because reservation land is owned "in trust" by the federal government, individuals living on reservations cannot build equity in their homes. This bars Native Americans from getting loans, as there is nothing that a bank can collect if the loan is not paid. Past efforts to encourage land ownership (such as the Dawes Act) resulted in a net loss of Tribal land. After they were familiarized with their smallholder status, Native American landowners were lifted of trust restrictions and their land would get transferred back to them, contingent on a transactional fee to the federal government. The transfer fee discouraged Native American land ownership, with 65% of tribal-owned land being sold to non-Native Americans by the 1920s. Activists against property rights point to historical evidence of communal ownership of land and resources by tribes. They claim that because of this history, property rights are foreign to Natives and have no place in the modern reservation system. Those in favor of property rights cite examples of tribes negotiating with colonial communities or other tribes about fishing and hunting rights in an area. Land ownership was also a challenge because of the different definitions of land that the Natives and the Europeans had. Most Native American tribes thought of property rights more as "borrowing" the land, while those from Europe thought of land as individual property.

Land ownership and bureaucratic challenges in historical context 
State-level efforts such as the Oklahoma Indian Welfare Act were attempts to contain tribal land in Native American hands. However, more bureaucratic decisions only expanded the size of the bureaucracy. The knowledge disconnect between the decision-making bureaucracy and Native American stakeholders resulted in ineffective development efforts.

Traditional Native American entrepreneurship does not prioritize profit maximization; rather, business transactions must align with Native American social and cultural values. In response to Indigenous business philosophy, the federal government created policies that aimed to formalize their business practices, which undermined the Native American status quo. Additionally, legal disputes interfered with tribal land leasing, which were settled with the verdict against tribal sovereignty.

Often, bureaucratic overseers of development are far removed from Native American communities and lack the knowledge and understanding to develop plans or make resource allocation decisions. The top-down heavy involvement in developmental operations corrupts bureaucrats into further self-serving agenda. Such incidences include fabricated reports that exaggerate results.

Geographic poverty 
While Native American urban poverty is attributed to hiring and workplace discrimination in a heterogeneous setting, reservation and trust land poverty rates are endogenous to deserted opportunities in isolated regions.

Trauma

Historical trauma 
Historical trauma is described as collective emotional and psychological damage throughout a person's lifetime and across multiple generations. Examples of historical trauma can be seen through the Wounded Knee Massacre of 1890, where over 200 unarmed Lakota were killed, and the Dawes Allotment Act of 1887, when American Indians lost four-fifths of their land.

Impacts of intergenerational trauma 
American Indian youth have higher rates of substance and alcohol use deaths than the general population. Many American Indians can trace the beginning of their substance and alcohol use to a traumatic event related to their offender's own substance use. A person's substance use can be described as a defense mechanism against the user's emotions and trauma. For American Indians alcoholism is a symptom of trauma passed from generation to generation and influenced by oppressive behaviors and policies by the dominant Euro-American society. Boarding schools were made to "Kill the Indian, Save the man". Shame among American Indians can be attributed to the hundreds of years of discrimination.

Food insecurity 

While research into Native American food security has gone unnoticed and under-researched until recent years, more studies are being conducted which reveal that Native Americans oftentimes experience higher rates of food insecurity than any other racial group in the United States. The studies do not focus on the overall picture of Native American households, however, and tend to focus rather on smaller sample sizes in the available research. In a study that evaluated the level of food insecurity among White, Asian, Black, Hispanic and Indigenous Americans: it was reported that over the 10-year span of 2000–2010, Indigenous people were reported to be one of the highest at-risk groups from a lack of access to adequate food, reporting anywhere from 20% to 30% of households suffering from this type of insecurity. There are many reasons that contribute to the issue, but overall, the biggest lie in high food costs on or near reservations, lack of access to well-paying jobs, and predisposition to health issues relating to obesity and/or mental health.

Society, language, and culture

The culture of Pre-Columbian North America is usually defined by the concept of the culture area, namely a geographical region where shared cultural traits occur. The northwest culture area, for example, shared common traits such as salmon fishing, woodworking, and large villages or towns and a hierarchical social structure. Ethnographers generally classify the Indigenous peoples of North America into ten cultural areas based on geographical region.

Though cultural features, language, clothing, and customs vary enormously from one tribe to another, there are certain elements which are encountered frequently and shared by many tribes. Early European American scholars described the Native Americans as having a society dominated by clans.

European colonization of the Americas had a major impact on Native American cultures through what is known as the Columbian exchange, also known as the Columbian interchange, which was the widespread transfer of plants, animals, culture, human populations, technology, and ideas between the Americas and Eurasia (the Old World) in the 15th and 16th centuries, following Christopher Columbus's 1492 voyage. The Columbian exchange generally had a destructive impact on Native American cultures through disease, and a 'clash of cultures', whereby European values of private land ownership, the family, and division of labor, led to conflict, appropriation of traditional communal lands and changed how the Indigenous tribes practiced slavery.

The impact of the Columbian exchange was not entirely negative, however. For example, the re-introduction of the horse to North America allowed the Plains Indian to revolutionize their ways of life by making hunting, trading, and warfare far more effective, and to greatly improve their ability to transport possessions and move their settlements.

The Great Plains tribes were still hunting the bison when they first encountered the Europeans. The Spanish reintroduction of the horse to North America in the 17th century and Native Americans' learning to use them greatly altered the Native Americans' cultures, including changing the way in which they hunted large game. Horses became such a valuable, central element of Native lives that they were counted as a measure of wealth by many tribes.

In the early years, as Native peoples encountered European explorers and settlers and engaged in trade, they exchanged food, crafts, and furs for blankets, iron and steel implements, horses, trinkets, firearms, and alcoholic beverages.

Ethno-linguistic classification

The Na-Dené, Algic, and Uto-Aztecan families are the largest in terms of the number of languages. Uto-Aztecan has the most speakers (1.95 million) if the languages in Mexico are considered (mostly due to 1.5 million speakers of Nahuatl); Na-Dené comes in second with approximately 200,000 speakers (nearly 180,000 of these are speakers of Navajo), and Algic in third with about 180,000 speakers (mainly Cree and Ojibwe). Na-Dené and Algic have the widest geographic distributions: Algic currently spans from northeastern Canada across much of the continent down to northeastern Mexico (due to later migrations of the Kickapoo) with two outliers in California (Yurok and Wiyot); Na-Dené spans from Alaska and western Canada through Washington, Oregon, and California to the U.S. Southwest and northern Mexico (with one outlier in the Plains). Several families consist of only 2 or 3 languages. Demonstrating genetic relationships has proved difficult due to the great linguistic diversity present in North America. Two large (super-) family proposals, Penutian and Hokan, look particularly promising. However, even after decades of research, a large number of families remain.

A number of words used in English have been derived from Native American languages.

Language education

To counteract a shift to English, some Native American tribes have initiated language immersion schools for children, where an Indigenous American language is the medium of instruction. For example, the Cherokee Nation initiated a 10-year language preservation plan that involved raising new fluent speakers of the Cherokee language from childhood on up through school immersion programs as well as a collaborative community effort to continue to use the language at home. This plan was part of an ambitious goal that, in 50 years, will result in 80% or more of the Cherokee people being fluent in the language. The Cherokee Preservation Foundation has invested $3 million in opening schools, training teachers, and developing curricula for language education, as well as initiating community gatherings where the language can be actively used. Formed in 2006, the Kituwah Preservation & Education Program (KPEP) on the Qualla Boundary focuses on language immersion programs for children from birth to fifth grade, developing cultural resources for the general public and community language programs to foster the Cherokee language among adults.

There is also a Cherokee language immersion school in Tahlequah, Oklahoma, that educates students from pre-school through eighth grade. Because Oklahoma's official language is English, Cherokee immersion students are hindered when taking state-mandated tests because they have little competence in English. The Department of Education of Oklahoma said that in 2012 state tests: 11% of the school's sixth-graders showed proficiency in math, and 25% showed proficiency in reading; 31% of the seventh-graders showed proficiency in math, and 87% showed proficiency in reading; 50% of the eighth-graders showed proficiency in math, and 78% showed proficiency in reading. The Oklahoma Department of Education listed the charter school as a Targeted Intervention school, meaning the school was identified as a low-performing school but has not so that it was a Priority School. Ultimately, the school made a C, or a 2.33 grade point average on the state's A-F report card system. The report card shows the school getting an F in mathematics achievement and mathematics growth, a C in social studies achievement, a D in reading achievement, and an A in reading growth and student attendance. "The C we made is tremendous", said school principal Holly Davis, "[t]here is no English instruction in our school's younger grades, and we gave them this test in English." She said she had anticipated the low grade because it was the school's first year as a state-funded charter school, and many students had difficulty with English. Eighth graders who graduate from the Tahlequah immersion school are fluent speakers of the language, and they usually go on to attend Sequoyah High School where classes are taught in both English and Cherokee.

Indigenous foodways 

Historical diets of Native Americans differed dramatically from region to region. Different peoples might have relied more heavily on agriculture, horticulture, hunting, fishing, or gathering wild plants and fungi. Tribes developed diets best suited to their environments.

Iñupiat, Yupiit, Unangan, and fellow Alaska Natives fished, hunted, and harvested wild plants, but did not rely on agriculture. Coastal peoples relied more heavily on sea mammals, fish, and fish eggs, while inland peoples hunted caribou and moose. Alaskan Natives prepared and preserved dried and smoked meat and fish.

In the Eastern Woodlands, early peoples independently invented agricultural and by 1800 BCE developed the crops of the Eastern Agricultural Complex, which include squash (Cucurbita pepo ssp. ovifera), sunflower (Helianthus annuus var. macrocarpus), goosefoot (Chenopodium berlandieri), and marsh elder (Iva annua var. macrocarpa).

The Sonoran desert region including parts of Arizona and California, part of a region known as Aridoamerica, relied heavily on the tepary bean (Phaseolus acutifolius) as a staple crop. This and other desert crops, mesquite bead pods, tunas (prickly pear fruit), cholla buds, saguaro cactus fruit, and acorns are being actively promoted today by Tohono O'odham Community Action. In the Southwest, some communities developed irrigation techniques while others, such as the Hopi dry-farmed. They filled storehouses with grain as protection against the area's frequent droughts.

Maize or corn, first cultivated in what is now Mexico was traded north into Aridoamerica and Oasisamerica, southwest. From there, maize cultivation spread throughout the Great Plains and Eastern Woodlands by 200 CE. Native farmers practiced polycropping maize, beans, and squash; these crops are known as the Three Sisters. The beans would replace the nitrogen, which the maize leached from the ground, as well as using corn stalks for support for climbing. The deficiencies of a diet heavily dependent on maize were mitigated by the common practice among Native Americans of converting maize kernels into hominy in a process called Nixtamalization.

The agriculture gender roles of the Native Americans varied from region to region. In the Southwest area, men prepared the soil with hoes. The women were in charge of planting, weeding, and harvesting the crops. In most other regions, the women were in charge of most agriculture, including clearing the land. Clearing the land was an immense chore since the Native Americans rotated fields.

Europeans in the eastern part of the continent observed that Native Americans cleared large areas for cropland. Their fields in New England sometimes covered hundreds of acres. Colonists in Virginia noted thousands of acres under cultivation by Native Americans.

Early farmers commonly used tools such as the hoe, maul, and dibber. The hoe was the main tool used to till the land and prepare it for planting; then it was used for weeding. The first versions were made out of wood and stone. When the settlers brought iron, Native Americans switched to iron hoes and hatchets. The dibber was a digging stick, used to plant the seed. Once the plants were harvested, women prepared the produce for eating. They used the maul to grind the corn into a mash. It was cooked and eaten that way or baked as cornbread.

Religion

Native American religious practices, beliefs, and philosophies differ widely across tribes. These spiritualities, practices, beliefs, and philosophies may accompany adherence to another faith or can represent a person's primary religious, faith, spiritual or philosophical identity. Much Native American spirituality exists in a tribal-cultural continuum, and as such cannot be easily separated from tribal identity itself.

Cultural spiritual, philosophical, and faith ways differ from tribe to tribe and person to person. Some tribes include the use of sacred leaves and herbs such as tobacco, sweetgrass or sage. Many Plains tribes have sweatlodge ceremonies, though the specifics of the ceremony vary among tribes. Fasting, singing and prayer in the ancient languages of their people, and sometimes drumming are also common.

The Midewiwin Lodge is a medicine society inspired by the oral history and prophesies of the Ojibwa (Chippewa) and related tribes.

Another significant religious body among Native peoples is known as the Native American Church. It is a syncretistic church incorporating elements of Native spiritual practice from a number of different tribes as well as symbolic elements from Christianity. Its main rite is the peyote ceremony. Prior to 1890, traditional religious beliefs included Wakan Tanka. In the American Southwest, especially New Mexico, a syncretism between the Catholicism brought by Spanish missionaries and the native religion is common; the religious drums, chants, and dances of the Pueblo people are regularly part of Masses at Santa Fe's Saint Francis Cathedral. Native American-Catholic syncretism is also found elsewhere in the United States. (e.g., the National Kateri Tekakwitha Shrine in Fonda, New York, and the National Shrine of the North American Martyrs in Auriesville, New York). Some Native American tribes who practice Christianity, including the Lumbee, organized denominations, such as the Lumber River Conference of the Holiness Methodist Church.

The eagle feather law (Title 50 Part 22 of the Code of Federal Regulations) stipulates that only individuals of certifiable Native American ancestry enrolled in a federally recognized tribe are legally authorized to obtain eagle feathers for religious or spiritual use. The law does not allow Native Americans to give eagle feathers to non-Native Americans.

Gender roles

Gender roles are differentiated in many Native American tribes. Many Natives have retained traditional expectations of sexuality and gender, and continue to do so in contemporary life despite continued and on-going colonial pressures.

Whether a particular tribe is predominantly matrilineal or patrilineal, often both sexes have some degree of decision-making power within the tribe. Many Nations, such as the Haudenosaunee Five Nations and the Southeast Muskogean tribes, have matrilineal or Clan Mother systems, in which property and hereditary leadership are controlled by and passed through the maternal lines. In these Nations, the children are considered to belong to the mother's clan. In Cherokee culture, women own the family property. When traditional young women marry, their husbands may join them in their mother's household.

Matrilineal structures enable young women to have assistance in childbirth and rearing and protect them in case of conflicts between the couple. If a couple separates or the man dies, the woman has her family to assist her. In matrilineal cultures the mother's brothers are usually the leading male figures in her children's lives; fathers have no standing in their wife and children's clan, as they still belong to their own mother's clan. Hereditary clan chief positions pass through the mother's line and chiefs have historically been selected on the recommendations of women elders, who could also disapprove of a chief.

In the patrilineal tribes, such as the Omaha, Osage, Ponca, and Lakota, hereditary leadership passes through the male line, and children are considered to belong to the father and his clan. In patrilineal tribes, if a woman marries a non-Native, she is no longer considered part of the tribe, and her children are considered to share the ethnicity and culture of their father.

In patriarchal tribes, gender roles tend to be rigid. Men have historically hunted, traded and made war while, as life-givers, women have primary responsibility for the survival and welfare of the families (and future of the tribe). Women usually gather and cultivate plants, use plants and herbs to treat illnesses, care for the young and the elderly, make all the clothing and instruments, and process and cure meat and skins from the game. Some mothers use cradleboards to carry an infant while working or traveling. In matriarchal and egalitarian nations, the gender roles are usually not so clear-cut and are even less so in the modern era.

At least several dozen tribes allowed polygyny to sisters, with procedural and economic limits.

Lakota, Dakota, and Nakota girls are encouraged to learn to ride, hunt and fight. Though fighting in war has mostly been left to the boys and men, occasionally women have fought as well – both in battles and in defense of the home – especially if the tribe was severely threatened.

Modern education
 90% of Native American school-aged children attend public schools operated by school districts. Tribally-operated schools under contracts/grants with the Bureau of Indian Education (BIE) and direct BIE-operated schools take about 8% of Native American students, including students who live in very rural remote areas.

In 1978, 215,000 (78%) of Native Americans attended school district-operated public schools, 47,000 (17%) attended schools directly operated by the BIA, 2,500 (1%) attended tribal schools and/or other schools that contracted with the BIA, and the remaining 9,000 (3%) attended missionary schools for Native American children and/or other private schools.

Sports

Native American leisure time led to competitive individual and team sports. Jim Thorpe, Lewis Tewanima, Joe Hipp, Notah Begay III, Chris Wondolowski, Jacoby Ellsbury, Joba Chamberlain, Kyle Lohse, Sam Bradford, Jack Brisco, Tommy Morrison, Billy Mills, Angel Goodrich, Shoni Schimmel, and Kyrie Irving are well known professional athletes.

Team sports
Native American ball sports, sometimes referred to as lacrosse, stickball, or baggataway, were often used to settle disputes, rather than going to war, as a civil way to settle potential conflict. The Choctaw called it isitoboli ("Little Brother of War"); the Onondaga name was dehuntshigwa'es ("men hit a rounded object"). There are three basic versions, classified as Great Lakes, Iroquoian, and Southern.

The game is played with one or two rackets or sticks and one ball. The object of the game is to land the ball in the opposing team's goal (either a single post or net) to score and to prevent the opposing team from scoring on your goal. The game involves as few as 20 or as many as 300 players with no height or weight restrictions and no protective gear.

Individual sports
Chunkey was a game that consisted of a stone-shaped disk that was about 1–2 inches in diameter. The disk was thrown down a  corridor so that it could roll past the players at great speed. The disk would roll down the corridor, and players would throw wooden shafts at the moving disk. The object of the game was to strike the disk or prevent your opponents from hitting it.

U.S. Olympics
Jim Thorpe, a Sauk and Fox Native American, was an all-around athlete playing football and baseball in the early 20th century. Future President Dwight Eisenhower injured his knee while trying to tackle the young Thorpe. In a 1961 speech, Eisenhower recalled Thorpe: "Here and there, there are some people who are supremely endowed. My memory goes back to Jim Thorpe. He never practiced in his life, and he could do anything better than any other football player I ever saw."

In the 1912 Olympics, Thorpe could run the 100-yard dash in 10 seconds flat, the 220 in 21.8 seconds, the 440 in 51.8 seconds, the 880 in 1:57, the mile in 4:35, the 120-yard high hurdles in 15 seconds, and the 220-yard low hurdles in 24 seconds. He could long jump 23 ft 6 in and high-jump 6 ft 5 in. He could pole vault , put the shot , throw the javelin , and throw the discus . Thorpe entered the U.S. Olympic trials for the pentathlon and the decathlon.

Louis Tewanima, Hopi people, was an American two-time Olympic distance runner and silver medalist in the 10,000-meter run in 1912. He ran for the Carlisle Indian School where he was a teammate of Jim Thorpe. His silver medal in 1912 remained the best U.S. achievement in this event until another Indian, Billy Mills, won the gold medal in 1964. Tewanima also competed at the 1908 Olympics, where he finished in ninth place in the marathon.[1]

Ellison Brown, of the Narragansett people from Rhode Island, better known as "Tarzan" Brown, won two Boston Marathons (1936, 1939) and competed on the United States Olympic team in the 1936 Olympic Games in Berlin, Germany, but did not finish due to injury. He qualified for the 1940 Olympic Games in Helsinki, Finland, but the games were canceled due to the outbreak of World War II.

Billy Mills, a Lakota and USMC officer, won the gold medal in the 10,000-meter run at the 1964 Tokyo Olympics. He was the only American ever to win the Olympic gold in this event. An unknown before the Olympics, Mills finished second in the U.S. Olympic trials.

Billy Kidd, part Abenaki from Vermont, became the first American male to medal in alpine skiing in the Olympics, taking silver at age 20 in the slalom in the 1964 Winter Olympics at Innsbruck, Austria. Six years later at the 1970 World Championships, Kidd won the gold medal in the combined event and took the bronze medal in the slalom.

Ashton Locklear (Lumbee), an uneven bars specialist was an alternate for the 2016 Summer Olympics U.S. gymnastics team, the Final Five. In 2016, Kyrie Irving (Sioux) also helped Team USA win the gold medal at the 2016 Summer Olympics. With the win, he became just the fourth member of Team USA to capture the NBA championship and an Olympic gold medal in the same year, joining LeBron James, Michael Jordan, and Scottie Pippen.

Music

Traditional Native American music is almost entirely monophonic, but there are notable exceptions. Native American music often includes drumming or the playing of rattles or other percussion instruments but little other instrumentation. Flutes and whistles made of wood, cane, or bone are also played, generally by individuals, but in former times also by large ensembles (as noted by Spanish conquistador de Soto). The tuning of modern flutes is typically pentatonic.

Performers with Native American parentage have occasionally appeared in American popular music such as Rita Coolidge, Wayne Newton, Gene Clark, Buffy Sainte-Marie, Blackfoot, and Redbone (members are also of Mexican descent). Some, such as John Trudell, have used music to comment on life in Native America. Other musicians such as R. Carlos Nakai, Joanne Shenandoah and Robert "Tree" Cody integrate traditional sounds with modern sounds in instrumental recordings, whereas the music by artist Charles Littleleaf is derived from ancestral heritage as well as nature. A variety of small and medium-sized recording companies offer an abundance of recent music by Native American performers young and old, ranging from pow-wow drum music to hard-driving rock-and-roll and rap. In the International world of ballet dancing Maria Tallchief was considered America's first major prima ballerina, and was the first person of Native American descent to hold the rank. along with her sister Marjorie Tallchief both became star ballerinas.

The most widely practiced public musical form among Native Americans in the United States is that of the pow-wow. At pow-wows, such as the annual Gathering of Nations in Albuquerque, New Mexico, members of drum groups sit in a circle around a large drum. Drum groups play in unison while they sing in a native language and dancers in colorful regalia dance clockwise around the drum groups in the center. Familiar pow-wow songs include honor songs, intertribal songs, crow-hops, sneak-up songs, grass-dances, two-steps, welcome songs, going-home songs, and war songs. Most Indigenous communities in the United States also maintain traditional songs and ceremonies, some of which are shared and practiced exclusively within the community.

Art

The Iroquois, living around the Great Lakes and extending east and north, used strings or belts called wampum that served a dual function: the knots and beaded designs mnemonically chronicled tribal stories and legends, and further served as a medium of exchange and a unit of measure. The keepers of the articles were seen as tribal dignitaries.

Pueblo peoples crafted impressive items associated with their religious ceremonies. Kachina dancers wore elaborately painted and decorated masks as they ritually impersonated various ancestral spirits.
Pueblo people are particularly noted for their traditional high-quality pottery, often with geometric designs and floral, animal and bird motifs. Sculpture was not highly developed, but carved stone and wood fetishes were made for religious use. Superior weaving, embroidered decorations, and rich dyes characterized the textile arts. Both turquoise and shell jewelry were created, as were formalized pictorial arts.

Navajo spirituality focused on the maintenance of a harmonious relationship with the spirit world, often achieved by ceremonial acts, usually incorporating sandpainting. For the Navajo, the sand painting is not merely a representational object, but a dynamic spiritual entity with a life of its own, which helped the patient at the center of the ceremony re-establish a connection with the life force. These vivid, intricate, and colorful sand creations were erased at the end of the healing ceremony.

The Native American arts and crafts industry brings in more than a billion in gross sales annually.

Native American art comprises a major category in the world art collection. Native American contributions include pottery, paintings, jewellery, weavings, sculpture, basketry, and carvings. Franklin Gritts was a Cherokee artist who taught students from many tribes at Haskell Institute (now Haskell Indian Nations University) in the 1940s, the Golden Age of Native American painters. The integrity of certain Native American artworks is protected by the Indian Arts and Crafts Act of 1990, which prohibits the representation of art as Native American when it is not the product of an enrolled Native American artist. Attorney Gail Sheffield and others claim that this law has had "the unintended consequence of sanctioning discrimination against Native Americans whose tribal affiliation was not officially recognized". Native artists such as Jeanne Rorex Bridges (Echota Cherokee) who was not enrolled ran the risk of fines or imprisonment if they continued to sell their art while affirming their Indian heritage.

Interracial relations

Interracial relations between Native Americans, Europeans, and Africans is a complex issue that has been mostly neglected with "few in-depth studies on interracial relationships".

Assimilation

European impact was immediate, widespread, and profound already during the early years of colonization and the creation of the countries which currently exist in the Americas. Europeans living among Native Americans were often called "white indians". They "lived in native communities for years, learned native languages fluently, attended native councils, and often fought alongside their native companions".

Early contact was often charged with tension and emotion, but also had moments of friendship, cooperation, and intimacy. Marriages took place in English, Spanish, French, and Russian colonies between Native Americans and Europeans though Native American women were also the victims of rape.

There was fear on both sides, as the different peoples realized how different their societies were. Many whites regarded Native people as "savages" because the Native people were not Protestant or Roman Catholic and therefore the Native people were not considered to be human beings. Orthodox Christians never viewed Native people as savages or sub-human. The Native American author, Andrew J. Blackbird, wrote in his History of the Ottawa and Chippewa Indians of Michigan (1897), that white settlers introduced some immoralities into Native American tribes. Many Native Americans suffered because the Europeans introduced alcohol. Many Native people do not break down alcohol in the same way as people of Eurasian background. Many Native people were learning what their body could tolerate of this new substance and died as a result of imbibing too much.

Blackbird wrote:

The U.S. government had two purposes when making land agreements with Native Americans: to open up more land for white settlement, and to "ease tensions" (in other words assimilate Native people to Eurasian social ways) between whites and Native Americans by forcing the Native Americans to use the land in the same way as did the whites—for subsistence farms. The government used a variety of strategies to achieve these goals; many treaties required Native Americans to become farmers in order to keep their land. Government officials often did not translate the documents which Native Americans were forced to sign, and native chiefs often had little or no idea what they were signing.

For a Native American man to marry a white woman, he had to get consent of her parents, as long as "he can prove to support her as a white woman in a good home". In the early 19th century, the Shawnee Tecumseh and blonde hair, blue-eyed Rebecca Galloway had an interracial affair. In the late 19th century, three European-American middle-class women teachers at Hampton Institute married Native American men whom they had met as students.

As European-American women started working independently at missions and Indian schools in the western states, there were more opportunities for their meeting and developing relationships with Native American men. For instance, Charles Eastman, a man of European and Lakota origin whose father sent both his sons to Dartmouth College, got his medical degree at Boston University and returned to the West to practice. He married Elaine Goodale, whom he met in South Dakota. He was the grandson of Seth Eastman, a military officer from Maine, and a chief's daughter. Goodale was a young European-American teacher from Massachusetts and a reformer, who was appointed as the U.S. superintendent of Native American education for the reservations in the Dakota Territory. They had six children together.

European enslavement

The majority of Native American tribes did practice some form of slavery before the European introduction of African slavery into North America, but none exploited slave labor on a large scale. Most Native American tribes did not barter captives in the pre-colonial era, although they sometimes exchanged enslaved individuals with other tribes in peace gestures or in exchange for their own members. When Europeans arrived as colonists in North America, Native Americans changed their practice of slavery dramatically. Native Americans began selling war captives to Europeans rather than integrating them into their own societies as they had done before. As the demand for labor in the West Indies grew with the cultivation of sugar cane, Europeans enslaved Native Americans for the Thirteen Colonies, and some were exported to the "sugar islands". The British settlers, especially those in the southern colonies, purchased or captured Native Americans to use as forced labor in cultivating tobacco, rice, and indigo. Accurate records of the numbers enslaved do not exist because vital statistics and census reports were at best infrequent. Scholars estimate tens to hundreds of thousands of Native Americans may have been enslaved by the Europeans, being sold by Native Americans themselves or Europeans.

In Colonial America, slavery soon became racialized, with those enslaved by the institution consisting of ethnic groups (non-Christian Native Americans and Africans) who were foreign to the Christian, European colonists. The House of Burgesses define the terms of slavery in Virginia in 1705:

The slave trade of Native Americans lasted only until around 1750. It gave rise to a series of devastating wars among the tribes, including the Yamasee War. The Indian Wars of the early 18th century, combined with the increasing importation of African slaves, effectively ended the Native American slave trade by 1750. Colonists found that Native American slaves could easily escape, as they knew the country. The wars cost the lives of numerous colonial slave traders and disrupted their early societies. The remaining Native American groups banded together to face the Europeans from a position of strength. Many surviving Native American peoples of the southeast strengthened their loose coalitions of language groups and joined confederacies such as the Choctaw, the Creek, and the Catawba for protection. Even after the Indian Slave Trade ended in 1750, the enslavement of Native Americans continued (mostly through kidnappings) in the west and in the Southern states. Both Native American and African enslaved women suffered rape and sexual harassment by male slaveholders and other white men.

Native American and African relations

African and Native Americans have interacted for centuries. The earliest record of Native American and African contact occurred in April 1502, when Spanish colonists transported the first Africans to Hispaniola to serve as slaves.

Sometimes Native Americans resented the presence of African Americans. The "Catawaba tribe in 1752 showed great anger and bitter resentment when an African American came among them as a trader". To gain favor with Europeans, the Cherokee exhibited the strongest color prejudice of all Native Americans. Because of European fears of a unified revolt of Native Americans and African Americans, the colonists tried to encourage hostility between the ethnic groups: "Whites sought to convince Native Americans that African Americans worked against their best interests." In 1751, South Carolina law stated:

In addition, in 1758 the governor of South Carolina James Glen wrote:

Europeans considered both races inferior and made efforts to make both Native Americans and Africans enemies. Native Americans were rewarded if they returned escaped slaves, and African Americans were rewarded for fighting in the late 19th-century Indian Wars.

According to the National Park Service, "Native Americans, during the transitional period of Africans becoming the primary race enslaved, were enslaved at the same time and shared a common experience of enslavement. They worked together, lived together in communal quarters, produced collective recipes for food, shared herbal remedies, myths and legends, and in the end they intermarried." Because of a shortage of men due to warfare, many tribes encouraged marriage between the two groups, to create stronger, healthier children from the unions.

In the 18th century, many Native American women married freed or runaway African men due to a decrease in the population of men in Native American villages. Records show that many Native American women bought African men but, unknown to the European sellers, the women freed and married the men into their tribe. When African men married or had children by a Native American woman, their children were born free, because the mother was free (according to the principle of partus sequitur ventrem, which the colonists incorporated into law).

While numerous tribes used captive enemies as servants and slaves, they also often adopted younger captives into their tribes to replace members who had died. In the Southeast, a few Native American tribes began to adopt a slavery system similar to that of the American colonists, buying African American slaves, especially the Cherokee, Choctaw, and Creek. Though less than 3% of Native Americans owned slaves, divisions grew among the Native Americans over slavery. Among the Cherokee, records show that slaveholders in the tribe were largely the children of European men who had shown their children the economics of slavery. As European colonists took slaves into frontier areas, there were more opportunities for relationships between African and Native American peoples.

Racial identity

In the 2010 Census, nearly 3 million people indicated that their race was Native American (including Alaska Native). Of these, more than 27% specifically indicated "Cherokee" as their ethnic origin. Many of the First Families of Virginia claim descent from Pocahontas or some other "Indian princess". This phenomenon has been dubbed the "Cherokee Syndrome". Across the US, numerous individuals cultivate an opportunistic ethnic identity as Native American, sometimes through Cherokee heritage groups or Indian Wedding Blessings.

Some tribes (particularly some in the Eastern United States) are primarily made up of individuals with an unambiguous Native American identity, despite having a large number of mixed-race citizens with prominent non-Native ancestry. More than 75% of those enrolled in the Cherokee Nation have less than one-quarter Cherokee blood, and the former Principal Chief of the Cherokee Nation, Bill John Baker, is 1/32 Cherokee, amounting to about 3%.

Historically, numerous Native Americans assimilated into colonial and later American society, e.g. through adopting English and converting to Christianity. In many cases, this process occurred through forced assimilation of children sent off to special boarding schools far from their families. Those who could pass for white had the advantage of white privilege. With the enforcement of blood quantum laws, Indian blood could be diluted over generations through interbreeding with non-Native populations, as well as intermarrying with tribes that were not recognized by the United States government. "Kill the Indian, save the man" was a mantra of nineteenth-century U.S. assimilation policies.

Native Americans are more likely than any other racial group to practice interracial marriage, resulting in an ever-declining proportion of Indigenous blood among those who claim a Native American identity. Some tribes will even resort to disenrollment of tribal members unable to provide scientific "proof" of Native ancestry, usually through a Certificate of Degree of Indian Blood. Disenrollment has become a contentious issue in Native American reservation politics.

Admixture and genetics

Intertribal mixing was common among many Native American tribes prior to European contact, as they would adopt captives taken in warfare. Individuals often had ancestry from more than one tribe, particularly after tribes lost so many members from disease in the colonial era and after. Bands or entire tribes occasionally split or merged to form more viable groups in reaction to the pressures of climate, disease and warfare.

A number of tribes traditionally adopted captives into their group to replace members who had been captured or killed in battle. Such captives were from rival tribes and later were taken from raids on European settlements. Some tribes also sheltered or adopted white traders and runaway slaves, and others owned slaves of their own. Tribes with long trading histories with Europeans show a higher rate of European admixture, reflecting years of intermarriage between Native American women and European men, often seen as advantageous to both sides. A number of paths to genetic and ethnic diversity among Native Americans have occurred.

In recent years, genetic genealogists have been able to determine the proportion of Native American ancestry carried by the African-American population. The literary and history scholar Henry Louis Gates, Jr., had experts on his TV programs who discussed African-American ancestry. They stated that 5% of African Americans have at least 12.5% Native American ancestry, or the equivalent to one great-grandparent, which may represent more than one distant ancestor. A greater percentage could have a smaller proportion of Indian ancestry, but their conclusions show that popular estimates of Native American admixture may have been too high. Genetic testing research in 2015 found varied ancestries which show different tendencies by region and sex of ancestors. Though DNA testing is limited, these studies found that, on average, African Americans have 73.2–82.1% West African, 16.7%–29% European, and 0.8–2% Native American genetic ancestry, with large variation between individuals.

DNA testing is not sufficient to qualify a person for specific tribal membership, as it cannot distinguish among Native American tribes; however, some tribes, such as the Meskwaki Nation, require a DNA test in order to enroll in the tribe.

In Native American DNA: Tribal Belonging and the False Promise of Genetic Science, Kim Tallbear states that a person, "… could have up to two Native American grandparents and show no sign of Native American ancestry. For example, a genetic male could have a maternal grandfather (from whom he did not inherit his Y chromosome) and a paternal grandmother (from whom he did not inherit his mtDNA) who were descended from Native American founders, but mtDNA and Y-chromosome analyses would not detect them."

Native American identity has historically been based on culture, not just biology, as many American Indian peoples adopted captives from their enemies and assimilated them into their tribes. The Indigenous Peoples Council on Biocolonialism (IPCB) notes that:

"Native American markers" are not found solely among Native Americans. While they occur more frequently among Native Americans, they are also found in people in other parts of the world.

Geneticists state:

Not all Native Americans have been tested; especially with the large number of deaths due to disease such as smallpox, it is unlikely that Native Americans only have the genetic markers they have identified [so far], even when their maternal or paternal bloodline does not include a [known] non-Native American.

Tribal membership

To receive tribal services, a Native American must be a certified (or enrolled) member of a federally recognized tribal organization. Each tribal government makes its own rules for the eligibility of citizens or tribal members. Among tribes, qualification for enrollment may be based upon a required percentage of Native American "blood" (or the "blood quantum") of an individual seeking recognition, or documented descent from an ancestor on the Dawes Rolls or other registers. But, the federal government has its own standards related to who qualifies for services available to certified Native Americans. For instance, federal scholarships for Native Americans require the student both to be enrolled in a federally recognized tribe and to be of at least one-quarter Native American descent (equivalent to one grandparent), attested to by a Certificate of Degree of Indian Blood (CDIB) card issued by the federal government.

Some tribes have begun requiring genealogical DNA testing of individuals' applying for membership, but this is usually related to an individual's proving parentage or direct descent from a certified member. Requirements for tribal membership vary widely by tribe. The Cherokee require documented direct genealogical descent from a Native American listed in the early 1906 Dawes Rolls. Tribal rules regarding the recognition of members who have heritage from multiple tribes are equally diverse and complex. Federally recognized tribes do not accept genetic-ancestry results as appropriate documentation for enrollment and do not advise applicants to submit such documentation.

Tribal membership conflicts have led to a number of legal disputes, court cases, and the formation of activist groups. One example of this is the Cherokee Freedmen. Today, they include descendants of African Americans once enslaved by the Cherokees, who were granted, by federal treaty, citizenship in the historic Cherokee Nation as freedmen after the Civil War. The modern Cherokee Nation, in the early 1980s, passed a law to require that all members must prove descent from a Cherokee Native American (not Cherokee Freedmen) listed on the Dawes Rolls, resulting in the exclusion of some individuals and families who had been active in Cherokee culture for years.

Increased self-identification
Since the 2000 United States Census, people may identify as being of more than one race. Since the 1960s, the number of people claiming Native American ancestry has grown significantly and, by the 2000 census, the number had more than doubled. Sociologists attribute this dramatic change to "ethnic shifting" or "ethnic shopping"; they believe that it reflects a willingness of people to question their birth identities and adopt new ethnicities which they find more compatible.

The author Jack Hitt writes:

Journalist Mary Annette Pember (Ojibwe) writes that non-Natives identifying with Native American identity may be a result of a person's increased interest in genealogy, the romanticization of what they believe the cultures to be, and family lore of Native American ancestors in the distant past. However, there are different issues if a person wants to pursue enrollment as a citizen of a tribal nation. Different tribes have different requirements for citizenship. Often those who live as non-Natives, yet claim distant heritage, say they are simply reluctant to enroll, arguing that it is a method of control initiated by the federal government. However, it is the tribes that set their own enrollment criteria, and "the various enrollment requirements are often a hurdle that ethnic shoppers are unable to clear." Says Dr. Grayson Noley, (Choctaw), of the University of Oklahoma, “If you have to search for proof of your heritage, it probably isn’t there.” In other cases, there are some individuals who are 100% Native American but, if all of their recent ancestors are from different tribes, blood quantum laws could result in them not meeting the citizenship criteria for any one of those individual tribes. Pember concludes:

Genetics

The genetic history of Indigenous peoples of the Americas primarily focuses on human Y-chromosome DNA haplogroups and human mitochondrial DNA haplogroups. "Y-DNA" is passed solely along the patrilineal line, from father to son, while "mtDNA" is passed down the matrilineal line, from mother to offspring of both sexes. Neither recombines, and thus Y-DNA and mtDNA change only by chance mutation at each generation with no intermixture between parents' genetic material. Autosomal "atDNA" markers are also used, but differ from mtDNA or Y-DNA in that they overlap significantly. Autosomal DNA is generally used to measure the average continent-of-ancestry genetic admixture in the entire human genome and related isolated populations. Within mtDNA, genetic scientists have found specific nucleotide sequences classified as "Native American markers" because the sequences are understood to have been inherited through the generations of genetic females within populations that first settled the "New World". There are five primary Native American mtDNA haplogroups in which there are clusters of closely linked markers inherited together. All five haplogroups have been identified by researchers as "prehistoric Native North American samples", and it is commonly asserted that the majority of living Native Americans possess one of the common five mtDNA haplogroup markers.

The genetic pattern indicates Indigenous Americans experienced two very distinctive genetic episodes; first with the initial-peopling of the Americas, and secondly with European colonization of the Americas. The former is the determinant factor for the number of gene lineages, zygosity mutations and founding haplotypes present in today's Indigenous American populations.

Human settlement of the New World occurred in stages from the Bering sea coast line, with an initial 15,000 to 20,000-year layover on Beringia for the small founding population. The micro-satellite diversity and distributions of the Y lineage specific to South America indicates that certain Amerindian populations have been isolated since the initial colonization of the region. The Na-Dené, Inuit and Indigenous Alaskan populations exhibit haplogroup Q-M242 (Y-DNA) mutations, however, that are distinct from other Indigenous Amerindians, and that have various mtDNA and atDNA mutations. This suggests that the paleo-Indian migrants into the northern extremes of North America and Greenland were descended from a later, independent migrant population.

Genetic analyses of HLA I and HLA II genes as well as HLA-A, -B, and -DRB1 gene frequencies links the Ainu people of northern Japan and southeastern Russia to some Indigenous peoples of the Americas, especially to populations on the Pacific Northwest Coast such as Tlingit. Scientists suggest that the main ancestor of the Ainu and of some Native American groups can be traced back to Paleolithic groups in Southern Siberia.

See also

 Alcohol and Native Americans
 Indian Actors Association
 List of Alaska Native tribal entities
 List of historical Indian reservations in the United States
 List of Indian reservations in the United States
 List of Native American firsts
 List of Native Americans of the United States (notable Native Americans)
 List of writers from peoples indigenous to the Americas
 Military history of Native Americans
 Mythologies of the Indigenous peoples of the Americas
 Native American civil rights
 Native American Heritage Sites (National Park Service)
 Native Americans in popular culture
 Native Americans in United States elections
 Outline of United States federal Indian law and policy
 Sexual victimization of Native American women
 Suicide among Native Americans in the United States
 List of U.S. communities with Native-American majority populations
 Indigenous peoples of Arizona
 Indigenous peoples of Florida
 Indigenous peoples of California

References

Further reading

 Adams, David Wallace. Education for Extinction: American Indians and the Boarding School Experience 1875–1928, University Press of Kansas, 1975.  (hbk);  (pbk).
 Anderson, Owanah. Jamestown Commitment: the Episcopal Church [i.e. the Protestant Episcopal Church in the U.S.A.] and the American Indian. Cincinnati, Ohio: Forward Movement Publications, 1988. 170 p. 
 Barak, Gregg, Paul Leighton, and Jeanne Flavin. Class, Race, Gender, and Crime: The Social Realities of Justice in America. Lanham, MD: Rowman and Littlefield, 2010. .
 Barnes, Ian. The Historical Atlas of Native Americans. Chartwell Books, 2015. . 
 Bierhorst, John. A Cry from the Earth: Music of North American Indians. .
 Deloria, Vine. 1969. Custer Died for Your Sins: An Indian Manifesto. New York: Macmillan.
 Dunbar-Ortiz, Roxanne (September 2014). An Indigenous Peoples' History of the United States, Boston: Beacon Press.
 Dunbar-Ortiz, Roxanne (February 2015). "Native Land and African Bodies, the Source of U.S. Capitalism", in Monthly Review, Volume 66, Number 9. Book review of Walter Johnson, River of Dark Dreams: Slavery and Empire in the Cotton Kingdom (Cambridge, MA: Belknap Press, 2013)
 Electronic Code of Federal Regulations (e-CFR), Title 50: Wildlife and Fisheries Part 22-Eagle permits 
 Hirschfelder, Arlene B.; Byler, Mary G.; & Dorris, Michael. Guide to research on North American Indians. American Library Association (1983). .
 Jones, Peter N. Respect for the Ancestors: American Indian Cultural Affiliation in the American West. Boulder, CO: Bauu Press (2005). .
 
 
 Nabokov, Peter, "The Intent Was Genocide" (review of Jeffrey Ostler, Surviving Genocide: Native Nations and the United States from the American Revolution to Bleeding Kansas, Yale University Press, 533 pp.), The New York Review of Books, vol. LXVII, no. 11 (July 2, 2020), pp. 51–52. Writes Nabokov (p. 52): "[D]uring the formative years of our republic and beyond, there was a mounting, merciless, uncoordinated but aggressively consistent crusade to eliminate [a recurring word is "extirpate"] the native residents of the United States from their homelands by any means necessary – and those homelands were everywhere."
 Nichols, Roger L. Indians in the United States & Canada, A Comparative History. University of Nebraska Press (1998). .
 
 
 
 
 Sletcher, Michael, "North American Indians", in Will Kaufman and Heidi Macpherson, eds., Britain and the Americas: Culture, Politics, and History, New York: Oxford University Press, 2005, 2 vols.
 
 Sturtevant, William C. (Ed.). Handbook of North American Indians (Vol. 1–20). Washington, D. C.: Smithsonian Institution. (Vols. 1–3, 16, 18–20 not yet published), (1978–present).
 Tiller, Veronica E. (Ed.). Discover Indian Reservations USA: A Visitors' Welcome Guide. Foreword by Ben Nighthorse Campbell. Denver, CO: Council Publications, 1992. .
 US Government. A Critical Bibliography on North American Indians (PDF)
 Washburn, Wilcomb E. The Indian in America (1975)

External links

 Official website of the Bureau of Indian Affairs, part of the U.S. Department of the Interior
 Official website of the National Congress of American Indians
 American Indian Records from the National Archives and Records Administration
 Official website of the National Museum of the American Indian, part of the Smithsonian Institution
 National Indian Law Library of the Native American Rights Fund – a law library of federal Indian and tribal law

Ethnic groups in the United States
Native American history
 
American culture
History of civil rights in the United States
History of the Thirteen Colonies
Social history of the United States